= Clearing bank =

Clearing bank may refer to:

- a bank that participates in clearing (finance)
  - Clearing house (finance)
- Cheque and Credit Clearing Company, whose members are the UK clearing banks

== See also ==
- Cheque clearing
