= On-us check =

Type of negotiable item

An on-us check is a negotiable item (check) which is drawn on the same bank that it is presented to for payment.

For example, a check drawn on Bank of America, presented for deposit at another branch of Bank of America, would be considered an on-us check. The same item presented for deposit at Wells Fargo Bank would be considered a transit check. Routing numbers, as well as the bank name printed on the check, help to determine an item's classification.

== See also ==
- Transit check
- Clearing
- Clearing house
- Routing number
