= Substitute checks in the United States =

Digital version of a banking check

Image Replacement Document
(Substitute Check)

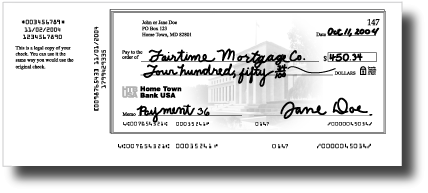
Front view of a substitute check

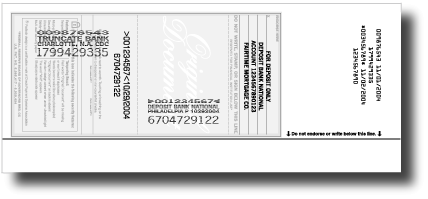
Rear view of a substitute check

A substitute check (also called an Image Replacement Document or IRD) is a negotiable instrument that is a digital reproduction of an original paper check. As a negotiable payment instrument in the United States, a substitute check maintains the status of a "legal check" in lieu of the original paper check. The formation and use of substitute checks are authorized under the Check Clearing for the 21st Century Act (the Check 21 Act).

Instead of presenting the original paper checks, financial institutions and payment-processing centers transmit data electronically during the settlement process. Substitute checks are processed for settlement through the United States Federal Reserve System or by clearing deposits of these payment instruments on the basis of private agreements between member financial institutions. Financial institutions that process substitute checks according to these private agreements are typically members of a clearinghouse that operates under the Uniform Commercial Code (UCC).

A substitute check is recognized as a legal check as long as the instrument meets specific requirements. These requirements include the faithful reproduction of the paper check and warranty of the instrument by the "reconverting bank" — the financial institution that created the substitute check or the first financial institution that transferred or presented it during the check-clearing process. Substitute checks are also subject to the UCC, federal and state check laws, and consumer-rights regulations. Although a substitute check is subject to the UCC and state and federal check laws, the Check 21 Act takes precedence over these other laws and regulations for this instrument.

== Specifications and standards ==
The Accredited Standards Committee X9 (ASC X9), a standards development committee accredited by the American National Standards Institute (ANSI), maintains, promotes, and supports technical financial standards for procedures, delivery, and transactions for financial products and services, including Image Replacement Documents and other financial instruments. American National Standard (ANS) X9.100-140 covers specifications for the content, processing, and quality of Image Replacement Documents specifically.

Certain standards that exist for paper checks also apply to Image Replacement Documents. These standards include ANS X9.100-160-2 (Magnetic Ink Printing (MICR)), Part 2, External Processing Code (EPC) Field Use); ANS X9.100-181 (Specifications for TIFF Image Format for Image Exchange); and ANS X9.100-187 (Specifications for Electronic Exchange of Check and Image Data — Domestic) that also cover electronic deposits using mobile phones.

== Eligible payment items for truncation and reconversion ==
Under the Check 21 Act, all U.S. paper checks and check-like instruments are eligible for removal of paper-based payment instruments from the clearing process (truncation) and reconverting them to substitute checks. Paper-based payment instruments that are eligible for conversion to substitute checks include consumer (personal) checks, commercial (business) checks, money orders, traveler's checks, cash advance or convenience checks tied to credit and charge card accounts, controlled disbursement checks, and payable through drafts, in addition to government warrants and U.S. Treasury checks.

The Check 21 Act permits any financial institution (such as a commercial bank or credit union) that participates in the check collection process to remove or truncate the original paper check from the forward collection or return process and reconvert the paper check to a substitute check. The removal of the original paper check from either process does not require an existing agreement beforehand between the bank of first deposit (BOFD) and the "paying bank".

The elimination of the paper check from the clearing process saves the banking and treasury management industries handling, sorting, transporting, storing, safeguarding, and mailing costs. After the financial institution truncates the original paper check and reconverts it to a substitute check, the financial institution can then store or archive the paper check, return the paper check to its own customer according to state law, or later destroy the paper check.

== Legal requirements ==
A properly prepared substitute check is considered the legal equivalent of the original paper check that can be accepted for payment or proof of payment in the same manner as the original check. Every substitute check must adhere to the following requirements before it can be recognized as the legal equivalent of the original check:

1. The substitute check must accurately represent all information depicted on the front and back of the original paper check at the time the financial institution removes or truncates the check from the process, including the names of the payor and payee, the courtesy and legal amounts, endorsements, and encoding information, among other details.
2. The substitute check must accurately represent the MICR line of the original check.
3. The substitute check must bear the legend "This is a LEGAL COPY of your check. You can use it the same way you would use the original check."
4. The financial institution or processor must provide a warranty for the substitute check. This warranty must be provided by the financial institution when it removes or truncates the original paper check from the forward collection or return process and reconverts the paper check to a substitute check.
5. The financial institution or processor that truncated the original check must follow ASC X9.100-140 standards in the capture of check images and MICR data when it produces the substitute check.

Image statements that include a series of pictures or images of original paper checks and/or substitute checks, photocopies of the original checks, and images of checks posted online are not recognized as the legal equivalents of substitute checks. Unlike a substitute check, a photocopy of a check cannot be presented through the check clearing process for settlement because the photocopy does not adhere strictly to the requirements for substitute checks under the Check 21 Act.

Since substitute checks are considered legal checks, substitute checks are subject to existing check laws and regulations. Other laws and regulations that govern substitute checks in the United States include the Expedited Funds Availability Act, Article 3 (Negotiable Instruments), and Article 4 (Bank Deposits and Collections) of the Uniform Commercial Code (UCC), along with a variety of state and federal regulatory laws. U.S. federal laws that also affect substitute checks include Federal Reserve regulations that provide for recrediting the amount of the substitute check in the case of fraud and duplicate payments caused by settlement of both the substitute check and the original check used for creating the substitute check. If any state law, federal law, or provision of the UCC conflicts with the Check 21 Act, the Check 21 Act takes precedence to the extent of the inconsistencies among those laws and provisions.

== Clearing process ==
=== Forward collection process ===
Each substitute check processed for forward collection is encoded with a "4" as the External Processing Code (EPC) in position 44 of the MICR line as required under ANS X9.90. An example of the forward collection process for substitute checks involves the following steps for financial institutions that process deposits through the Federal Reserve System:

1. The payee endorses the original paper check and presents it for deposit at the financial institution, such as a commercial bank or credit union (referred to as the depository financial institution).
2. The depository financial institution (Bank 1 – referred to as the bank of first deposit or BOFD) stamps its endorsement on the rear of the original check.
3. Bank 1 captures an image of the front and back of the original check and the MICR line data from the front of the check. Bank 1 then removes or truncates the original check from the clearing process and uses the check image, MICR data, its own electronic endorsement, and the electronic endorsements to create a substitute check.
4. Bank 1 electronically transmits the check image and the MICR line data captured from the original check to the paying bank (Bank 2) for settlement. If no agreement exists between Bank 1 and Bank 2 to exchange check images and data, Bank 1 must provide either the original check or the legal equivalent of the substitute check to Bank 2.
5. As the paying bank, Bank 2 uses check image and MICR data or information from the substitute check received from Bank 1 to process the item during the normal course of settlement.
6. After the settlement process, Bank 2 provides a copy of the substitute check to the customer who wrote the original check or includes information about the substitute check in that customer's monthly or periodic statement.

Any financial institution that participates in the forward collection (or return) process can become the reconverting financial institution if it creates the substitute check for transmittal and settlement.

=== Return process for dishonored checks ===
If a substitute check must be returned unpaid because of insufficient funds (a dishonored or bounced check), the paying bank (Bank 2) stamps the item NSF (non-sufficient funds) as the reason for the return. In this case, Bank 2 encodes a "5" as the EPC on the MICR line to identify the substitute check according to ANS X9.90, along with the routing number of the depository financial institution and the dollar amount of the substitute check. Bank 2 encodes this information on a return strip, perforated strip, or carrier document that the financial institution attaches to the dishonored substitute check. The paying bank then returns the dishonored substitute check through the routing process to the BOFD (Bank 1) for further handling. Once Bank 1 receives the dishonored substitute check, the financial institution issues a charge back notice to its customer who deposited or offered the check for settlement.

== See also ==
- Check (cheque) truncation
- Remote deposit

== External sources ==
- Regulation CC (Availability of Funds and Collection of Checks): Frequently Asked Questions about Check 21 (August 6, 2013). The Board of Governors of the Federal Reserve System, Washington, DC.
- Accredited Standards Committee (ASC) X9 Financial Industry Standards: Statement on Check 21 adoption (October 23, 2004)
- Anatomy of a substitute check. (2004). Federal Reserve Financial Services.
- Ways to Use Check 21 (March 2004). Electronic Check Clearing House Organization (ECCHO) (diagram of the forward collection and return processes for a substitute check)
- Substitute Checks: Development of Processing and Quality Standards. Electronic Check Clearing House Organization (ECCHO) (callouts to identify parts of a substitute check from the forward collection and return processes included at the end of the document)
- Check Clearing for the 21st Century Act — Foundation for Check 21 Compliance Training: Compliance Information for Examiners and Industry. Federal Financial Institutions Examination Council (FFIEC)
- Bank Endorsement Standards: Information and Usage (2025). Electronic Check Clearing House Organization (ECCHO)
