= French check processing fee controversy of 2010 =

In 2010, the French government's Autorité de la concurrence (the department in charge of regulating competition) fined eleven banks €384.9 million for colluding to charge unjustified fees for check processing, especially for extra fees charged during the transition from paper check transfer to "Exchanges Check-Image" electronic transfer.

The banks were:

- Banque de France
- BPCE
- Banque postale
- BNP Paribas
- Confédération Nationale du Crédit Mutuel
- Crédit Agricole
- Crédit du Nord
- Crédit Industriel et Commercial (CIC)
- HSBC
- LCL
- Société Générale

== See also ==
- Cheque fraud
- Cheque truncation
- Substitute check
- Check 21
