= Lockbox (accounts receivable) =

Service offered by commercial banks

In banking, a lockbox is a service offered to organizations by commercial banks to simplify collection and processing of accounts receivable by having those organizations' customers' payments mailed directly to a location accessible by the bank.

== General ==
In general, a lockbox is a post-office box (PO box) that is accessible by a bank. A company may set up a lockbox service with its bank for receiving customers' payments. The company's customers send their payments to the PO box. Then the bank collects and processes these payments directly and deposits them to the company's account. Businesses that operate in multiple regions can have separate lockboxes with banks in different regions. They can then provide their customers with the respective lockbox addresses they are supposed to mail their checks to. A lockbox payment is a way of accepting cheques from customers with the help of a bank’s P.O. box allotted to a business. Typical costs are several cents per transaction to as high as one dollar or more.

There are usually two types of lockbox service available, one whereby the payments (cheques in this instance), their associated remittance advices and any other correspondence, and usually the envelope they were all sent in, are all physically scanned. This is the standard service. The more expensive service provides the same level of aforementioned scanning, and where there is remittance advice information, which is commonly a list of invoice numbers, credits notes etc that the payer expects the payment to be used to reconcile against, this is also keyed into the main text-based document that contains the cheque data (via the MICR code). Where this service is used the charge is normally per keystroke.

Lockbox services are sometimes called "remittance services" or "remittance processing".

One benefit of the lockbox service to the commercial customer is that it can maintain special mailboxes in different locations around the country and a customer sends payment to the closest lockbox. The company then authorizes a bank to check these mailboxes as often as is reasonable, given the number of payments that will be received. Because the bank is making the collection, the funds that have been received are immediately deposited into the company's account without first being processed by the company's accounting system, thereby speeding up cash collection.

== Wholesale and retail ==
Lockbox services are generally divided into wholesale and retail.

Retail lockboxes are for companies with high volumes of consumer-oriented payments such as utility payments, loan payments, etc., and these remittances often include a standardized "payment coupon".

Wholesale lockboxes are for corporate-to-corporate payments and tend to be higher dollar amounts than retail lockbox transactions. These transactions usually do not include a standardized payment coupon and require more manual effort for the bank to process.

== Electronic conversion ==
With the advent of cheque truncation, it has become common to "capture" images of the checks and associated documentation (payment coupons, for example) into a digital format for use in computer systems (i.e., TIFF, JPEG or PDF files). These files can then undergo OCR and data validation when character confidence is low and then further specialized processing may take place. Banks often use specialized mail processing and document scanner equipment that can scan hundreds, or thousands, of checks per minute.

Specialized software increases the productivity of the banking customers allowing them to receive electronic data and images from the bank and automation exists that can quickly move the images into document-management systems, work-flow systems and accounting systems. In the health-care industry, this data is converted into edi 835 5010 ERA format (electronic remittance advice).

Due to the Check 21 Act, most lockbox services convert checks to electronic images, and the paper checks are shredded and the electronic checks are sent electronically to the originating bank.

=== Online bill-payment services ===
Many online electronic bill-pay services are not 100 percent online. The payee might not be set up to accept electronic payments, so the bill-pay service will print out large numbers of paper checks and then mail them to the lockbox, where they will be processed alongside all the other paper checks.

=== Offshoring ===
Transferring data from paper to electronic format involves labor-intensive data entry work. This has prompted a movement to "offshore" the data entry of the information on checks to countries (e.g., India) that have abundant employees – which helps in ultimately lowering the costs.

== See also ==
- Commercial mail receiving agency
- Cash management
- Remittance advice
- Remote deposit
