= WeRe Bank =

Fictional bank

The WeRe Bank is a Manchester-based website created in 2015 by sovereign citizen Alan Peter Smith (calling himself "Peter of England"), which presents itself as a banking organization. The site promotes various pseudolaw conspiracy theories, and sells books of cheques which resemble standard British bank cheques but which have no value, that are falsely implied to be a means of debt elimination. Various financial regulators in the UK (including the Financial Conduct Authority and the Financial Ombudsman Service) and in other jurisdictions have issued public warnings noting that it is not a legitimate banking institution.

WeRe Bank describes itself as "the free, fair, and final public bank system", and promises "assured debt eradication". It trades in an invented currency called the "Re" (a "unit of space and time"). Members pay a £35 joining fee, a £10 per month membership fees, and deposit a promissory note promising to pay £150,000 to the bank within ten years; in exchange they receive a book of "WeRe Cheques". However, as WeRe Bank is not a bank within the C&CCC or even a company, and does not subscribe to the standards of the UK Payments Administration nor any of the world's clearing houses), the payees will not receive payment of the amounts on the cheques, meaning that the debt is unpaid, and can be increased by late payment fees, return cheque charges and legal costs.

== Regulator reaction ==
In September 2015, the UK's Financial Conduct Authority posted a "Consumer Notice" regarding WeRe Bank. This opened by saying that "The FCA has received many reports from consumers, public bodies and commercial organisations about an entity styling itself as WeRe Bank. Find out more about WeRe Bank's activities and why we have some concerns about it." The notice continued:

Although WeRe Bank refers to itself as a bank, based on the information currently available to us, it does not appear to be carrying on any activities that would require it to be authorised by the FCA. Regulated activities carried out by authorised firms include accepting deposits or providing advice on regulated investments.

We are concerned that vulnerable consumers may be attracted to WeRe Bank's claim that they will be able to pay off their debts 'for free' using RE cheques, even though they have not had to pay any money into an account.

...We have received numerous reports from financial institutions, councils, utility companies and other businesses that have been presented with WeRe cheques by consumers attempting to pay off their debts. None of these institutions has accepted the cheques as legitimate payment.

...we advise any consumers considering dealing with WeRe Bank to exercise caution.

The Financial Ombudsman Service gave a similar warning:

We believe that you are unlikely to be able to pay any of your debts using a cheque from WeRe Bank. Instead, you may end up with additional charges from your creditors for late payment. You could eventually be subject to other sanctions such as County Court Judgements or repossession proceedings.

Other regulators, including the Irish Central Bank and New Zealand Banking Ombudsman Scheme, have also issued warnings.

== See also ==
- Redemption movement – another source of worthless check-like drafts based on a fringe theory.
