= Expedited Funds Availability Act =

Act passed by the U.S. Congress in 1987

The Expedited Funds Availability Act (EFA or EFAA) was enacted in 1987 by the United States Congress for the purpose of standardizing hold periods on deposits made to commercial banks and to regulate institutions' use of deposit holds. It is also referred to as Regulation CC or Reg CC, after the Federal Reserve regulation that implements the act. The law is codified in Title 12, Chapter 41 of the US Code and Title 12, Part 229 of the Code of Federal Regulations.

== Disclosure ==
Financial institutions must disclose their hold policies to all account holders, and make the policy available in written form upon request by any customer. It must also be provided at the time of opening of all new accounts.

Additional disclosures are required on deposit slips, at automated teller machines, and when the policy is changed in any way.

== Types of hold ==
Regulation CC stipulates four types of holds that a bank may place on a check deposit at its discretion. Each has its own qualifications and it is legal for the bank to place any type where the requirements are met, although bank policy may instruct that the type of hold placed be the one that holds the most funds the longest that can be applied legally.

As of February 27, 2010, there is only one check processing region for the entire United States. Therefore, all checks are now local.

| Hold type | Necessary requirements | Local availability |
|---|---|---|
| Statutory | No other hold applies, can be placed almost anytime. | $200 first business day following deposit, $600 second business day following deposit, remainder third business day |
| Large deposit | Aggregate total of checks deposited into one account on one business day is greater than $5,000.00. | $200 first business day following deposit, $600 second business day following deposit, $4,800 third business day following deposit, remainder seventh business day |
| New account | The account being deposited into has been open for less than 30 days. | Ninth business day |
| Exception | Account has been overdrawn for six or more business days of the previous six months. (Repeated Overdraft hold) Account has been overdrawn for two or more business days in excess of $5,525 in the previous six months. (Repeated Overdraft hold) The depository bank has reason to doubt the check is good. (The paying bank indicates the check will not clear, is suspected to be fraudulent, or is either postdated or staledated.) The item being deposited is a legal copy of an item previously returned for NSF (an IRD). Item is accepted for deposit during a power outage or computer failure (extremely rare). | Seventh business day |

Regarding insurance checks, if the insurance check is drawn on an in-state bank funds will be available on the 5th business day; if the insurance check is drawn on an out-of-state bank funds will be available on the 7th business day.

There are a few exceptions to these guidelines that are important to note. If an account owner is depositing into an account that does not qualify for the exception hold but also owns another account that does qualify, then the Exception NSF Hold can be placed. In the same manner, if an account owner is depositing into an account that has been open for less than 30 days but owns another account that has been open greater than 30 days, the New Account Hold cannot be legally placed.

There are certain items that present less risk to financial institutions and thus are subject to expedited availability under the stipulations of Regulation CC. The following items must have the first $5000 available for the Statutory, Large Deposit and New Account Hold by the first business day following the deposit:

- Cashier's checks, certified checks, or teller's checks*;
- Postal money orders;
- U.S. Treasury checks;
- Checks drawn on a Federal Reserve Bank or Federal Home Loan Bank;
- Any check issued by a state, city, county, or other municipality;
- Any check drawn from another account at the depository institution.

For each of these items, the item must be presented for deposit into the payee's account for it to receive expedited fund availability; when one of these checks is presented for deposit into a third party account, it loses its preferential treatment. Also, the bank may require use of a special deposit slip or envelope for next-day availability of cashier's checks, certified checks, teller's checks, or state & local government checks; if it does so, it must notify customers and tell them how to obtain the special slip or envelope.

*Regulation CC defines a "cashier's check" as a check that is issued by a bank, drawn on that same bank, is a direct liability of the bank, and signed by one or more officers of that bank. Though the term "teller's check" is commonly used only by Federal credit unions, under Regulation CC any check "drawn by the bank, and drawn on another bank or payable through or at a bank" is a "teller's check" if issued "for remittance purposes". "Official Checks" or "Bank Checks" may not qualify as "cashier's checks" under Regulation CC, but they usually qualify for next-day availability as "teller's checks".

== Payment of interest ==
According to the regulation, interest-bearing accounts shall receive earnings from funds from the time they are collected by the depository institution, regardless of hold lengths.

== Enforcement ==
Under the act, enforcement is divided by the type of institution, respective to each type's mandated oversight authority:

- For national banks, federal savings associations, federal savings banks, and federal branches and agencies of foreign banks, the act is enforced by the Office of the Comptroller of the Currency;
- For members of the Federal Reserve System who are not national banks, and for offices, branches, and agencies of foreign banks located in the United States (who are not federal branches and agencies of foreign banks), the provisions are enforced by the Board of Governors of the Federal Reserve;
- In the case of banks insured by the Federal Deposit Insurance Corporation who are not members of the Federal Reserve System, and insured state branches of foreign banks, enforcement falls to the Board of Directors of the Federal Deposit Insurance Corporation (FDIC);
- Federal credit unions or credit unions insured by the National Credit Union Share Insurance Fund are subject to enforcement of the act by the National Credit Union Administration Board.

Awards for damages are limited under the regulation, including not more than $1000 in addition to actual damages for individual actions, and not more than the lesser of $500,000 or 1% of the net worth of the bank, in addition to actual damages, for class actions.

== Related legislation ==
On June 9, 2014, the United States House of Representatives passed H.R. 1679 To amend the Expedited Funds Availability Act to clarify the application of that Act to American Samoa and the Northern Mariana Islands. The bill, if it were to become law, would extend "by two business days, for American Samoa, any time periods established for large or redeposited check, repeated overdraft, reasonable cause, or other emergency exceptions to the 30-day funds availability requirements for deposits in an depository institution account by a new depositor." It would also apply "this two-day extension to any deposit in an account at a depository institution located in American Samoa by a check drawn on an originating depository institution which is not located in the same state as the receiving depository institution."

== See also ==
- Check 21 Act

== Notes ==
1. 12 USC 40 can be viewed here, on the website of the Legal Information Institute at Cornell Law School. Text of 12 CFR 229 can be viewed here, through the GPO.
