= Transit check =

Type of negotiable item

A transit check or not on-us check is a negotiable item (check) which is drawn on another bank than that at which it is presented for payment.

For example, a check drawn on Bank of America, presented for deposit at Wells Fargo Bank, would be considered a transit item by Wells Fargo, while the same item presented for cash or deposit at Bank of America would be an on-us check. Routing numbers, as well as the bank name printed on the check, help to determine an item's classification.

== See also ==
- On-us check
- Clearing
- Clearing house
- Routing number
