= Collection item =

A collection item (also called a noncash item) is an item presented to a bank for deposit that the bank will not, under its procedures, provisionally credit to the depositor's account or which the bank cannot (due to provisions or law or regulation) provisionally credit to a depositor's account. Collection items do not create float. Payment must be received from the payor bank before the item may be credited to the depositor's account.

A collection item may be contrasted with a "demand item" or cash item, under which the bank credits the depositor's account immediately. Cheques are usually handled by banks as a cash item, on the assumption that the payor bank will honor the check. Cheques create float (cash in the payor's account which the payor still has access to while the transition has yet to be finalized).

Other types of collection items include:

- Dishonoured cheques or "bad cheques"
- Bank drafts
- Negotiable instruments

A noncash item is a special kind of collection item. Noncash items include checks which carry special instructions, checks drawing on funds in foreign banks, and bankers' acceptances.

In the United States, fees are generally imposed on collection items due to the special handling which they require.

== See also ==
- Warrant of payment

== Bibliography ==
- American Bankers Association. Banking & Finance Terminology. Washington, D.C.: American Bankers Association, 1999.
- Coe, Charle K. Nonprofit Financial Management: A Practical Guide. Hoboken, N.J.: Wiley, 2011.
- Fitch, Thomas P. Dictionary of Banking Terms. Hauppauge, N.Y.: Barron's, 2006.
- Speidel, Richard E. and Rusch, Linda J. Commercial Transactions: Sales, Leases, and Licenses. St. Paul, Minn.: West Group, 2001.
