= Electronic Check Council =

The Electronic Check Council (ECC) is a US organization that provides a forum for stakeholders of NACHA-The Electronic Payments Association to design, propose, monitor, and promote solutions that enable the conversion of paper checks to electronic entries.

The council was founded in 1995 and currently has more than 140 members, including financial institutions, vendors, retailers, processors, networks and associations.

== Purpose ==
- Implement electronic check applications that show the greatest potential.
- Support the testing of electronic check applications through pilot programs.
- Support research to address consumer, legal, regulatory and risk issues of electronic check applications.
- Provide a forum for all stakeholders in the electronic check arena.
- Promote the development and use of electronic check applications.

== Process ==
Developments at the ECC all start with discussion and development of solutions in small group settings. These smaller groups are designated as work groups and ad hoc groups that focus on specific areas of electronic check development.

A work group is an ongoing group that tackles a number of issues over a period of time related specifically either to a particular Standard Entry Class Code (such as POP, ARC, etc.) or to a specific topic that impacts all eCheck Standard Entry Class Codes (such as marketing).

An ad hoc group (or subgroup) tackles one specific issue and disbands once the issue has been resolved.

== See also ==
- Substitute check
- Automated Clearing House
