= Cheque and Credit Clearing Company =

Banking industry body in the United Kingdom

- Type: Subsidiary
- Industry: Financial services
- Founded: 1985; 41 years ago
- Headquarters: London, United Kingdom
- Area served: United Kingdom
- Services: Cheque clearing in the United Kingdom
- Parent: Pay.UK

The Cheque and Credit Clearing Company Limited (C&CCC) is a UK membership-based industry body whose 11 members are the UK clearing banks. The company has managed the cheque clearing system in England and Wales since 1985, in all of Great Britain since 1996 when it took over responsibility for managing the Scottish cheque clearing as well, and in the whole of the United Kingdom since the introduction of the Image Clearing System in 2019. It has been a subsidiary of Pay.UK since 2018.

As well as clearing cheques, the system processes the following forms of payment: banker's drafts, building society cheques, postal orders, warrants, government payable orders and traveller's cheques. The company also manages the systems for the clearing of paper bank giro credits (the credit clearing).

The clearing system in Northern Ireland was formerly operated by the Belfast Bankers' Clearing Company for the four clearing banks there.

== Terminology ==
In the United Kingdom, a clearing bank is a bank that is a direct member of the central clearing house system, now managed by Pay.UK. These banks can directly exchange and settle cheques, bank giro credits, and electronic payments (like Bacs and Faster Payments) with other banks.

Banks that are not clearing members – often newer fintech or digital banks – must use a clearing bank as their agent to process cheques and certain other payments, a process that can sometimes take longer than for direct clearing bank members.

== History ==
In 2009 3.5 million cheques and 360,000 paper credits passed through the British interbank clearing system each working day. Cheque volumes reached a peak in 1990 when 4 billion cheques were written, but usage has fallen since then. This is mainly due to alternative methods of payment such as direct debits, BACS payments and more recently, the Faster Payments Service, being used more widely by individuals and businesses. The annual rate of decline of the volume of cheques being used is now in double figures.

From the end of November 2007, changes known as 2-4-6 came into force. These increased clarity and certainty when paying in cheques to a bank or building society account. The 2-4-6 changes set a maximum time limit of two, four and six working days for each of the stages after paying in a cheque to a current or basic bank account. The timescales covered cheques, bankers' drafts, bankers' cheques and building society cheques paid into sterling current and basic bank accounts. For deposit or savings accounts the maximum time limit for withdrawal was longer (6 days, rather than 4).

For the first time, after depositing a cheque, customers could be sure that at the end of six working days, the money is theirs. They are protected from any loss if the cheque subsequently bounces, unless they are a knowing party to a fraud. The timescales also set maximum times when customers start earning interest on money paid in (2 days) and when it would be available for withdrawal.

Cheque and Credit Clearing Company Limited announced that on 1 July 2018 it had become a wholly owned subsidiary of NPSO Limited, the New Payments Systems Operator (Pay.UK), and that the C&CCC board had handed management over to the board of NPSO.

In July 2018, Pay.UK acquired the UK Payments Administration and the Cheque and Credit Clearing Company Limited (C&CCC) having previously acquired Bacs Payments System Limited (BPSL) and Faster Payments Service Limited (FPSL) in May 2018 as part of a consolidation of payment system organisation

In August 2019, the paper clearing system was shut down and replaced with a cheque truncation system called the cheque image clearing system.

== Members ==
Members of the Cheque and Credit Clearing Company are individually responsible for processing cheques drawn by, or credited to, the accounts of their customers. In addition, several hundred other institutions provide cheque facilities for their customers and obtain indirect access to the cheque clearing mechanisms by means of commercially negotiated agency arrangements with one of the full members.

Members of the Image Clearing System, as of 2024, were:

- Allied Irish Bank
- Bank of Ireland
- Barclays Bank
- ClearBank
- Clydesdale Bank
- Habib Bank AG Zurich
- HSBC UK
- Lloyds Bank
- Nationwide Building Society
- National Westminster Bank
- Northern Bank (trading as Danske Bank)
- Starling Bank
- Santander UK
- The Co-operative Bank
- Royal Bank of Scotland
- TSB Bank
- Turkish Bank
- Virgin Money UK
- Metro Bank

== See also ==
- Clearing house (finance)
- Clearing House Automated Payment System (CHAPS)
- Bankers Automated Clearing Services (BACS)
- Payments Council
- Faster Payments Service
