= Clearing balance requirement =

Clearing balance requirement (sometimes referred to as Settlement balances requirement) is the amount of money or balance which Financial institutions anticipate will be required to perform their clearing services for that day.

Section VIII of the United States Reserve Maintenance Manual states:

"....A depository institution with a reserve balance requirement that has an account at a Reserve Bank may wish to hold balances above its requirement to facilitate its clearing needs. In all of these cases, the Federal Reserve encourages the depository institution to establish a clearing balance requirement."
