= Sybrin =

South African software company

- Industry: Financial software Information management Insurance; Telecommunication
- Founded: 1991; 35 years ago
- Headquarters: Johannesburg, South Africa
- Area served: Africa; Europe; Southeast Asia
- Key people: Ryan Barlow; (CEO); Brendon Paul; (COO); Roland Van Hee; (CTO); Wynand Venter; (CFO); Christiana John; (CHRO); Joe Kiragu; (Regional Director)
- Number of employees: 250+

Sybrin is a software company headquartered in Johannesburg, South Africa that sells enterprise software and services to the financial services, insurance, and telecommunications industries. Sybrin implemented the first cheque truncation system in Africa, and the third in the world, in Malawi.

The company offers a low-code platform along with other prebuilt solutions in their digital banking and payments as well as their intelligent automation product range. These include Payments Hub, KYC and AML, Intelligent Document Processing, Liveness Detection, Digital Onboarding, and more.

Sybrin's clients include corporates, insurance companies, telecommunication service providers, banking institutions, as well as central banks and national Automated Clearing Houses.

Sybrin has key support offices in Kenya, Tanzania, Zambia, and Zimbabwe. Sybrin's systems have been implemented in Botswana, Egypt, Eswatini, Ghana, Gibraltar, Isle of Man, Kenya, Kuwait, Lesotho, Malawi, Mauritius, Mozambique, Nigeria, Philippines, Rwanda, Seychelles, South Africa, Tanzania, Uganda, United Kingdom, Zambia, and Zimbabwe.

Sybrin has more than 240 production solutions installed in over 20 countries and a staff complement of 250 people. The company attained the Microsoft Line of Business Award and has been accredited as an Oracle Platinum Partner.

== History ==
- Founded in 1991, Sybrin shifted its operational headquarters to Johannesburg, South Africa in 2002.
- In 2003, Sybrin obtained the contract for the implementation of the first cheque truncation system in Africa, the third in the world, which was implemented in Malawi.
- In 2005, Sybrin opened a support office in Kenya.
- In 2012, Sybrin opened support offices in Zambia and Tanzania.
- On 13 October 2013, Sybrin was acquired by EOH, a multinational technology company listed on the Johannesburg Stock Exchange.
- In 2020, Sybrin partnered with the Mojaloop Foundation to advance financial inclusion in Africa and expanded their markets through strategic partnerships with various other organisations, including: Blisslead, Console, eBizolutions, Insight SCS, Legal Workflow, Nybble, OpenTech Kenya, Quetri, and Software People.
- In 2021, One Thousand & One Voices (1K1V), a private equity fund, in partnership with diversified FinTech investment holding company, Crossfin Technology Holdings, and investor Isaac Mophatlane, acquired the Sybrin Group of Companies for R410 million.
