= BankServ =

American financial services company

- Formerly: Nova Payments
- Founded: 1996; 30 years ago
- Headquarters: Enterprise, Nevada
- Number of locations: 400 banks in more than 50 countries
- Area served: Las Vegas; San Francisco; Salt Lake City; Houston; London
- Key people: Dick David Kvederis

BankServ was a legacy financial services company headquartered in Enterprise, Nevada that developed electronic banking software and operated outsourced data processing centers used by banks and other businesses to move money electronically. BankServ was founded in 1996 and did business with over 400 banks in more than 50 countries, primarily supplying banks with the behind-the-scenes programs used for remote deposit, internet bill payment, mobile payments, wire transfer payments and sending messages over the international SWIFT network.

== History ==
Since 2004, BankServ expanded into the fields of consumer remote deposit, electronic bill payment and credit card processing, and added an international division with the acquisition of the London-based Symtec Corporation. BankServ has received a number of awards, including nominations to Inc. Magazine's Inc. 500 list in 2003 and 2004, a list of the fastest-growing privately held corporations in the United States. Most recently, BankServ was nominated to the Inc. 5,000 Fastest Growing Private Companies list every year from 2003-2010.^{1}

In January 2004, BankServ acquired Symtec Solutions, a provider of international money transfer and SWIFT financial messaging software headquartered in London, England.

In May 2009, BankServ acquired the assets of Commerciant, a Houston-based technology company involved in Wireless credit card processing. The company now offers a handheld terminal that can process credit card transactions on the spot over various mobile phone networks.

In 2010, BankServ acquired NetDeposit, one of its main rivals in the remote deposit field, from Zions Bancorporation in a primarily cash transaction. As a result of the acquisition, BankServ's check processing operations nearly doubled in size, and added new branch capture and mobile phone check deposit software. The company estimates that it now processes remote deposit transactions for more than 100,000 business customers in the United States.

In August 2011, private equity firm GTCR acquired the controlling interest in BankServ, poising the company for expansion and growth. GTCR's portfolio of more than 25 companies includes fast-growing firms in the financial services and technology, healthcare and information services and technology fields. GTCR subsequently announced its intention to merge BankServ with the Israeli payments firm Fundtech, a transaction that was completed in November 2011. The combined company is known as Fundtech and is/was headquartered in Jersey City, New Jersey.

In April 2015 D+H acquired Fundtech from the Chicago private-equity firm GCTR.

Later On 17 June 2017, D+H announced that it would be acquired by Vista Equity Partners and combined with Misys, operating under the new company name Finastra for a total enterprise value of approximately $4.8 billion.
