= James William Gilbart =

English banker and author

James William Gilbart (1794–1863) was an English banker and writer.

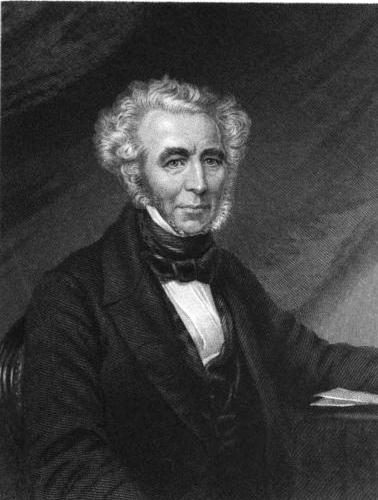
James William Gilbart

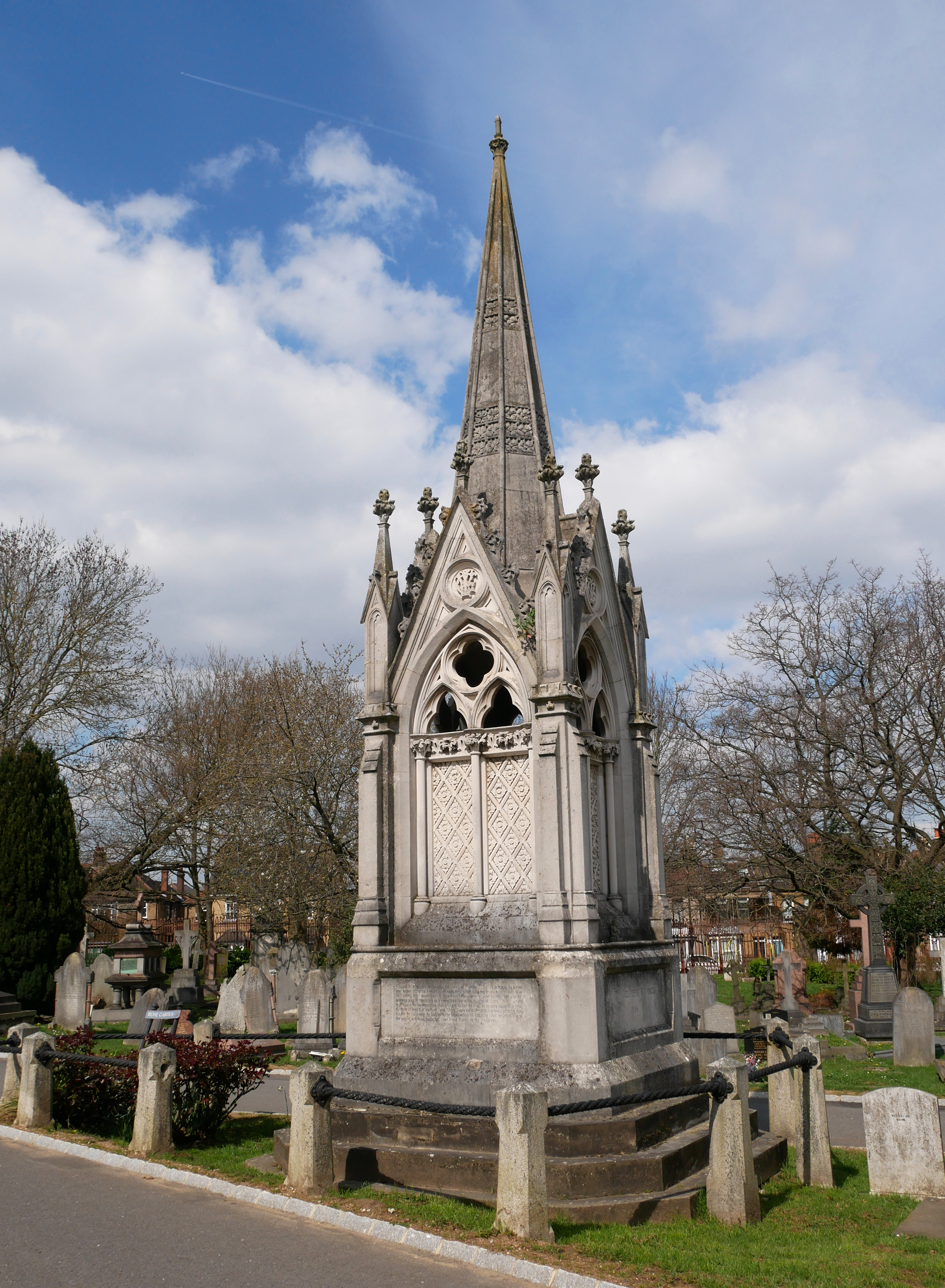
The tomb of Gilbart in West Norwood Cemetery

== Life ==
He was born in London.

He was the General Manager of the London and Westminster Bank 1833–1859, one of the first joint-stock banks in England.

His work and frequently updated books such as his Practical Treatise on Banking (1827) were eventually widely adopted to improve the British banking systems and laid the foundations of the modern publicly owned retail bank and Building Society movement.

It was Gilbart who standardised the modern spelling of the word cheque in his book Practical Treatise on Banking, and formalised this in subsequent legislation. Some claim that the spelling was derived from early notes issued by Goldsmiths of London.

Gilbart was made a Fellow of the Royal Society in 1846. He never married, and devoted much of his life to banking, writing, and his societies. He died at his home at Brompton Crescent, London and is buried in a Gothic Revival Grade II-listed mausoleum at West Norwood Cemetery accredited to the architect Sir William Tite.
