= Homeguard Products (New Zealand) Ltd v Kiwi Packaging Ltd =

- Court: High Court of New Zealand
- Full case name: Homeguard Products (New Zealand) Limited v Kiwi Packaging Limited
- Decided: 1981
- Citation: [1981] 2 NZLR 322

Court membership
- Judge sitting: Barker J

Keywords
- accord & satisfaction

Homeguard Products (New Zealand) Ltd v Kiwi Packaging Ltd [1981] 2 NZLR 322 was a case of the High Court of New Zealand, regarding whether the banking of cheques tendered as full settlement of disputed accounts. The High Court ruled that by banking the debtor's cheque, Kiwi Packaging consented to the terms attached to the cheque.

== Background ==
Kiwi Packaging supplied Homeguard with packaging materials. For unexplained reasons, a dispute arose between the parties just what the final balance owing was. This was not helped by Kiwi Packaging giving different amounts as the final balance, ranging from $901.84 to $1,187.60.

Homeguard thought the balance was even less than these amounts, with their calculation being for $765.97, and as a consequence, sent Kiwi Packaging a cheque for $765.97 with a note attached saying this amount was tendered "in full settlement of our account".

Kiwi Packaging, despite banking the cheque, sued Homeguard for the balance of $136 in the District Court, and won judgment for the balance remaining. Homeguard appealed to the High Court.

== Decision ==
By banking the debtor's cheque, Kiwi Packaging in effect consented to the terms attached to the cheque. Accordingly, the judge ruled that accord and satisfaction occurred, resulting in the debt being legally extinguished upon the creditor's banking of the cheque. Barker J said:

"It seems that there is some onus on a creditor wishing to escape the consequences of the general rule that an inference is to be drawn from the banking of the cheque in favour of the debtor; the creditor should very promptly indicate its dissent from the basis on which the cheque was sent".

The court was silent on just how long "promptly" might mean.
