= Turkish Bank =

Banking corporation

- Type: Incorporation
- Industry: Financial services
- Predecessor: Türk Bankası Ltd.
- Founded: 1 July 1901; 125 years ago
- Headquarters: Nişantaşı, Istanbul, Turkey
- Number of locations: 40
- Area served: Northern Cyprus; Turkey; United Kingdom
- Key people: Hakan Börteçene (Chairman)
- Products: Banking; Investment banking Investment management
- Number of employees: 500+
- Parent: Turkish Bank Group
- Website: www.turkishbank.com/en

Turkish Bank Group (Turkish: Türk Bankası) is a banking corporation established in 1901 as the Nicosia Savings Box in Cyprus to assist businesses by providing capital and financial support for local tradesmen.

By 1925, it had been turned into a savings bank, and by 1974 as Turkish Bank Ltd. (Turkish: Türk Bankası Ltd.) established branches in London. As of 2013, the bank is operating with branches in Haringay, Dalston, Edmonton, Lewisham and Palmers Green, along with headquarters and main branch located on Borough High Street near London Bridge.

Then in 1982, it opened its first branches on mainland Turkey, and in 1993 it issued its first credit cards.

It now operates under several names:

- Turkish Bank A.Ş. as a private bank (alongside Turkish Yatırım A.Ş) as an investment brokerage service.
- Allied Turkish Bank as an offshore bank in Northern Cyprus
- Türk Bankası Ltd. as a retail bank (19 branches) in Northern Cyprus
- Turkish Bank (UK) Ltd. in the United Kingdom
- Turkish Factoring (Turkey) as a factoring company
- Turkish Leasing (Turkey) as a leasing company

Turkish Bank Group established its presence in Turkey by opening a branch of Türk Bankası Ltd. In Istanbul in 1982. In 1988, a second branch in Izmir became operational. Next year, two more branches in Mersin and Ankara followed suit.

Turkish operations of the group were reorganized under a new separate entity when Turkish Bank A.Ş. was formed as an incorporated company at the end of 1991. In January 2008, paid-up capital reached 80 million Turkish lira.

In 2004, Levent; in 2005, Abdi İpekçi Private Banking; in 2006, Bayrampaşa and Adapazarı branches; in 2007 Pangaltı, Antalya, Ostim and Eskişehir; in 2008 Pendik and İstanbul corporate branches were opened. Currently, Turkish Bank has 19 locations inTurkey.

Turkish Bank is known in Turkey as being one of the most liquid banks.

Turkish Bank successfully becoming an independent member of the major UK payments schemes such as Bacs and Faster Payments. Another development was Türk Bankası Ltd., the group's Cypriot bank, signing a €5 million trade facilitation programme with the European Bank for Reconstruction and Development (EBRD).
