= National Automated Clearing House =

Indian payment clearing service

National Automated Clearing House, introduced by National Payments Corporation of India, is a centralised clearing service that aims at providing interbank high volume, low value transactions that are repetitive and periodic in nature. Offering credit and debit service to corporates, banks, and financial institutions, the service, aimed at integrating all regional ECS into one National Payment System, is claimed to be better than its predecessor, Electronic Clearing Service.

According to the service's website, transactions towards distribution of subsidies, dividends, interest, salary, pension etc. and also for bulk transactions towards collection of payments pertaining to telephone, electricity, water, loans, investments in mutual funds, insurance premium etc."

In March 2017, NPCI via a circular notified a paperless way for corporates to register NACH mandates for its customers, which can be later used to debit customer accounts.

== Electronic Clearing Service ==
Electronic Settling Service, or ECS, is an electronic clearing service that facilitates funds transfer between bank accounts. The service was started by Reserve Bank of India providing, both, debit and credit which can be used to pay utility bills.

== API based e-mandate process ==
User can authenticate a NACH API e-mandate on the web. The customer gets directed to the NPCI website, where customer has to choose their bank, and then authenticate via one of the two methods - 1. Net banking credentials 2. Debit card. Kotak Mahindra Bank became the first bank to allow customers to choose both methods for authentication. Since then, 38 banks allow customers to authenticate API based e-mandates as of September 2019.

API based E-mandate process is expected to make the process fast, frictionless and paperless.

== Membership ==
NPCI has categorised members of NACH system in three entities:

Sponsor banks are allowed to originate transactions the system required, they have a mutual agreement with NPCI and also are members of any payment system approved by the Reserve Bank of India.

Destination banks are allowed to do transaction, process mandates and update the Aadhaar mapper through the use of the system. On necessary agreement, all the banks that are members of any payment system participate on NACH system as Destination Banks.

The corporate/government departments, on submission of necessary agreement with their Sponsor Banks, participate on NACH system as Users. For this, to facilitate settlement on their behalf, the departments indicate the names of the Sponsor Banks with whom accounts are maintained.

NPCI notifies all of the members if a new member is added to the NACH network or if suspension or termination of a NACH member occurs.

== Comparison with ECS ==
- Registration for NACH takes approximately 15 days over ECS taking 30 days for registration.
- For future reference, NACH provides a unique number called Mandate Registration Reference Number.
