= Remote deposit =

Method to deposit cheques remotely by photograph or scanning

Remote deposit or mobile deposit is the ability of a bank customer to deposit a cheque into a bank account from a remote location, without having to physically deliver the cheque to the bank. This was originally accomplished by scanning a digital image of a cheque into a computer then transmitting that image to the bank, but is now accomplished with a smartphone. The practice became legal in the United States in 2004 when the Check Clearing for the 21st Century Act (Check 21 Act) took effect, though banks are not required to implement the system.

This service was originally used primarily by businesses with dedicated check scanners, but with the spread of smartphones and mobile banking it is now common in consumer banks.

== History ==
Remote deposits became legal in the United States in 2004 when the Check Clearing for the 21st Century Act (or Check 21 Act) went into effect. The Act is intended in part to keep the country's financial services operational in the event of a catastrophe that could make rapid long-distance transportation impossible, like the September 11, 2001, attacks. The Check 21 Act makes the digital image of a check legally acceptable for payment purposes, just like a traditional paper check.

Before 2004, if someone deposited a check in an account with one bank, the banks would have to physically exchange the paper check to the bank on which the check is drawn before the money would be credited to the account in the deposit bank. Under Check 21, the deposit bank can simply send an image of the check to the drawing bank. This reduction of the transportation time from total processing life cycle of a check provides a longer time for the corporation to process the checks, allowing for later deposits and faster check clearance.

Initially remote deposit capture (RDC) was used primarily by businesses. Check scanners were priced between $250 and $2,500 and were either purchased by the business or rented from the bank. These businesses were also often required to pay monthly fees or maintain a minimum account balance to reduce the risk of fraud. Businesses were screened by the bank to determine the risk of fraudulent checks and bounced checks, and they were audited by the bank to ensure proper check handling and disposal.

On July 4, 2009, Element Federal Credit Union (formerly WV United FCU)) became the first financial institution to deploy a smartphone app for mobile check deposit. USAA closely followed the launch of a mobile application in collaboration with Mitek Systems in August 2009. Several other banks began accepting mobile deposits in the early 2010s as the technology became more popular. Mobile Deposit allows smart phone users to snap a picture of the check with the phone's camera. The application automatically processes the picture and sends it to the bank for deposit. The customer does not mail in the original check, instead voiding or discarding it.

In 2013 the United Kingdom government proposed a similar digital cheque imaging law allowing mobile cheque deposit, which was put into place in 2014.

In 2020 Wells Fargo bank was ordered to pay $102.8 million in damages to USAA for infringing on mobile check deposit patents developed in 2008.

== Use ==
Remote deposit use has grown. A June 2009 survey by the Independent Community Bankers of America found that 62% of banks in the United States offered merchant remote deposit, and 78% had plans to adopt the technology by 2011.

Client adoption of remote deposit capture was projected to reach 1 million by 2010, and over 5 million by 2012.

According to an industry study conducted in late 2013, only 10% of U.S. banks and credit unions offered mobile deposits, though many more planned to do so. Research by Celent in 2013 showed that 20 million customers used mobile check deposits in 2013, a growth from 10.9 million in 2012 and 2.2 million in 2011, beating previous estimates.

By 2015 Celent estimated 87 million customers were using mobile check deposits, accelerating the decline of foot traffic to bank branches.

The 2020 Coronavirus pandemic accelerated trends of shifting consumer behavior, further increasing use of mobile check deposits and reducing in person check deposits, contributing to branch closures.

== See also ==
- Substitute check
- Cheque truncation
- Lock box
