= Cheque truncation =

Process of scanning cheques to produce their electronic copies

Example of a US truncated cheque
(Substitute check)

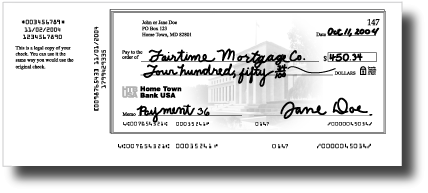
Front view

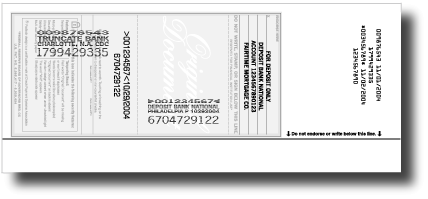
Rear view

Cheque truncation (check truncation in American English, also cheque imaging) is a cheque clearance system which uses the digitization of a physical paper cheque into a substitute electronic form for transmission to the paying bank. The process of cheque clearance, involving data matching and verification, is undertaken using digital images instead of paper originals.

Cheque truncation reduces or eliminates the physical movement of paper cheques and reduces the time and cost of cheque clearance. Cheque truncation also offers the potential reduction in settlement periods with the electronic processing of the cheque payment system.

== History ==
For cheque clearance, a cheque has to be presented to the drawee bank for payment. Originally, this was done by taking the cheque to the drawee bank, but as cheque usage increased, this became cumbersome and banks arranged to meet each day at a central location to exchange cheques and receive payment in money. This became known as central clearing. Bank customers who received cheques could deposit them at their own bank, who would arrange for the cheque to be forwarded to the drawee bank and the money credited to and debited from the appropriate accounts. If a cheque was dishonoured, it would be physically returned to the original bank marked as such.

This process would take several days, as the cheques had to be transported to the central clearing location, from where they were taken to the payee bank. If the cheque was dishonoured, it would be sent back to the bank where the cheque was deposited. This is known as the clearing cycle.

Cheques had to be examined by hand at each stage, which required a large amount of manpower.

In the 1960s, machine readable codes were added to the bottom of cheques in MICR format, which sped up the clearing and sorting process. However, the law in most countries still required cheques to be delivered to the payee bank, and so physical movement of the paper continued.

Starting in the mid-1990s, some countries started to change their laws to allow "truncation": cheques would be imaged and a digital representation of the cheque would be transmitted to the drawee bank, and the original cheques destroyed. The MICR codes and cheque details are normally encoded as text in addition to the image. The bank where the cheque was deposited would typically do the truncation and this dramatically decreased the time it took to clear a cheque. In some cases, large retailers that received large volumes of cheques would do the truncation.

Once the cheque has been turned into a digital document, it can be processed through the banking system just like any other electronic payment.

== Laws ==
Although technology needed to exist to enable cheque truncation, the laws related to cheques were the main impediment to its introduction. New Zealand was one of the first countries to introduce truncation and imaging of cheques, when in 1995 the Cheques Act 1960 was amended to provide for the electronic presentation of cheques. A number of other countries also adopted the system over the next few years, but progress was mixed due to the general decline in the use of cheques in favour of electronic payment systems. Some countries decided that the effort to implement truncation could not be justified for a declining payment method, and instead phased out the use of cheques altogether.

In 2004, the United States enacted the Check 21 Act to authorize cheque truncation by the conversion of an original paper check into an electronic image for presentation through the clearing process. The law also enacted the recognition and acceptance of a “substitute check" created by a financial institution in lieu of the original paper check. Any bank that receives the original paper check can remove or "truncate" the paper check from the clearing process.

In the UK, section 13 of the Small Business, Enterprise and Employment Act 2015 amended the Bills of Exchange Act 1882 to allow for cheque imaging ("providing an electronic image, in place of presentment of the cheque itself").

In Australia, section 68 of the Cheques Act 1986 holds that the institution on which a cheque is drawn has the right to possession of the cheque after it is presented for payment. However, this right is one of several that is identified in section 6 of the act as being open to negation or alteration by mutual agreement between concerned parties, and thus the Australian Payments Network – as operators of the Australian Paper Clearing System (APCS) – introduced electronic imaging by amending in May 2015 the APCS Procedures, which are binding on all clearing system participants, to state that "except in the case of a specific request for exhibition of a physical Item ... there shall be no physical exchange of Items between [participants] in the Australian Paper Clearing System".

New laws needed to address ways to make sure that the digital image was a true and accurate copy of the original cheque, as well as a mechanism to enable the process to be audited to protect consumers. It also needed to address the process for dishonoured cheques, as paper cheques could no longer be returned. A typical solution, as defined by the Monetary Authority of Singapore for the Singapore cheque truncation system, was that a special "Image Return Document" was created and sent back to the bank that had truncated the cheque.

== Operations and clearing ==
Security related to imaging and creating an electronic cheque is defined and the cheque clearing process adjusted to accommodate electronic cheques. Banks and financial institutions use cheque truncation systems (CTS) as part of this process. These systems deal with two main processes, outward clearing and inward clearing:

- outward clearing takes place at the branch level, where deposited cheques are scanned and an operator performs amount entry, account entry, verification, balancing and bundling. The cheques are then sent to a service branch.
- inward clearing takes place in the service branch where cheques received from branches are processed and an operator performs amount entry, account entry, verification, balancing and bundling of the cheques. Once verification is complete, the cheques are sent to the clearing house.

Those cheques that failed validation due to discrepancies are sent back to the originating branch to be corrected.

== Truncation software ==
Some banks have modified their bank systems or built proprietary system to handle truncation. There are also a number of software companies that provide commercial solutions and services, including:

Overview cheque truncation service providers
Provider	Package
VSoft	OnView Cheque Truncation System
IBM	Financial Transaction Manager for Check Services
BankServ	DepositNow
C&A Associates	ImageChex32
CSC	Checkvision
Dess Technologies	DessCTS
Image InfoSystems	ExpressClear
Data Support Systems	Sierra T.R.I.P.S
Fiserv	Director Check Imaging
IndiaPay	iCheq and mCheq
Infosys	-
Jack Henry & Associates	Alogent Solutions
Open Solutions	OpenCheck (IsCheck)
Polaris Financial Technology	Intellect Business Process Studio
ProgressSoft Corporation	PS-ECC Electronic Check Clearing
Sybrin	Cheque Solution
Tata Consultancy Services	-
DMS Software Engineering	IMAGO
WAUSAU Financial Systems	Optima3
Zylog Systems Limited	CTS

== National systems ==
- Substitute check in United States (Check 21 Act)
- Cheque truncation system - India

== See also ==
- Substitute check
- French check processing fee controversy of 2010
