= Cheque Truncation System =

Indian digital cheque clearing system

Cheque Truncation System (CTS) or Image-based Clearing System (ICS), in India, is a project of the Reserve Bank of India (RBI), commenced in 2010, for faster clearing of cheques. CTS is based on a cheque truncation or online image-based cheque clearing system where cheque images and magnetic ink character recognition (MICR) data are captured at the collecting bank branch and transmitted electronically.

Cheque truncation means stopping the flow of the physical cheques issued by a drawer to the drawee branch. The physical instrument is truncated at some point in route to the drawee branch and an electronic image of the cheque is sent to the drawee branch along with the relevant information like the MICR fields, date of presentation, presenting banks etc. This would eliminate the need to move the physical instruments across branches, except in exceptional circumstances, resulting in an effective reduction in the time required for payment of cheques, the associated cost of transit and delays in processing, etc., thus speeding up the process of collection or realization of cheques.

== History ==
The Reserve Bank of India first implemented CTS in National Capital Region, New Delhi from 1 February 2008 with ten pilot banks and the deadline was set as 30 April 2008 for all the banks. This was followed by launch of CTS in Chennai on 24 September 2011. After migration from MICR to CTS the traditional MICR based cheque processing was discontinued in NCR and Chennai.

Based on the experience gained and the benefits that would accrue to the customers and banks, it was decided to bring CTS into operation across the country. Starting 1 August 2013 only CTS-2010 compliant cheques would be accepted for clearing. On 17 July 2013 the RBI extended the deadline to 31 December 2013.

In October 2025, the Reserve Bank of India announced that, all cheques presented between 10 AM and 4 PM would be cleared or returned within three hours, as part of the “Continuous Clearing and Settlement on Realization” framework, an enhancement of the Cheque Truncation System. The first phase began on 4 October 2025, and the second phase commenced on 3 January 2026.

== Expected benefits ==
=== For banks ===
Banks derive multiple benefits through the implementation of CTS, like a faster clearing cycle meaning technically possible realization of proceeds of a cheque within the same day. It offers better reconciliation/ verification, better customer service and enhanced customer window. Operational efficiency provides a direct boost to bottom lines of banks as clearing of local cheques is a high cost low revenue activity. Besides, it reduces operational risk by securing the transmission route. Centralized image archival systems ensure that data storage and retrieval is easy. Reduction of manual tasks leads to reduction of errors. Real-time tracking and visibility of the cheques, less frauds with secured transfer of images to the RBI are other benefits that banks derive from this solution.

=== For customers ===
Customer satisfaction is enhanced, due to the reduced turn around time (TAT). It also offers better reconciliation and fraud prevention.

== See also ==
- Cheque truncation
- Cheque fraud
- Reserve Bank of India
