= Check 21 Act =

U.S. law allowing checks to be digitized

Check Clearing for the 21st Century Act
- Enacted by: the 108th United States Congress
- Effective: October 28, 2004

Citations
- Public law: Pub. L. 108–100 (text) (PDF)

Legislative history
- Signed into law by President George W. Bush on October 28, 2003

The Check Clearing for the 21st Century Act (or Check 21 Act) is a United States federal law, Pub. L. 108–100 (text) (PDF), that was enacted on October 28, 2003 by the 108th U.S. Congress. The Check 21 Act took effect one year later on October 28, 2004. The law allows the recipient of a paper check to create a digital version of the original, a process known as check truncation, into an electronic format called a "substitute check", thereby eliminating the need for further handling of the physical document. The recipient bank no longer returns the paper check but electronically transmits an image of both sides of the check to the bank it is drawn upon.

Consumers are most likely to see the effects of this act when they notice that certain checks (or images thereof) are no longer being returned to them with their monthly statement, even though other checks are still being returned. Another effect of the law is that it is now legal for anyone to use a computer scanner or mobile phone to capture images of checks and deposit them electronically, a process known as remote deposit.

Check 21 is not subject to ACH rules; therefore transactions are not subject to NACHA (The Electronic Payments Association) rules, regulations, fees and fines.

This act was passed in response to the events of 9/11/2001, at that time checks were still physically transported between banks. In the weeks after 9/11, planes were grounded, meaning checks were not transported in the timely manner consumers were used to. To prevent this breakdown of an at the time critical system of payment, this act was proposed and passed.

== Truncation ==
The Act lets banks take advantage of image technologies and electronic transport while not being dependent on other banks being ready to settle transactions with images instead of paper. The process of removing the paper check from its processing flow is called "check truncation". In truncation, both sides of the paper check are scanned to produce a digital image. If a paper document is still needed, these images are inserted into specially formatted documents containing a photo-reduced copy of the original checks called a "substitute check".

Once a check is truncated, businesses and banks can work with either the digital image or a print reproduction of it. Images can be exchanged between member banks, savings and loans, credit unions, servicers, clearinghouses, and the Federal Reserve Bank.

Not all banks have the ability to receive image files, so there are companies who offer the service. At the item processing center, the checks are sorted by machine according to the routing/transit (RT) number as presented by the magnetic ink character recognition (MICR) line, and scanned to produce a digital image. A batch file is generated and sent to the Federal Reserve Bank or presentment point for settlement or image replacement. If a substitute check is needed, the transmitting bank is responsible for the cost of generating and transporting it from the presentment point to the Federal Reserve Bank or other corresponding bank.

== Effects and developments ==
=== Remote deposit ===
Check 21 has also spawned a new bank treasury management product known as remote deposit. This process allows depositing customers the ability to capture front and rear images of checks along with their respective MICR data for those being deposited. This data is then uploaded to their depositing institution, and the customer's account is then credited. Remote deposit therefore precludes the need for merchants and other large depositors to travel to the bank (or branch) to physically make a deposit.

In addition to remote deposit, other such electronic depositing options are available to qualifying bank customers through NACHA. These options include "Point of Purchase Entry" (POP) and "Back Office Conversion Entry" (BOC) for retailers, and "Accounts Receivable Entry" (ARC) for high volume remittance receivers. These transactions are not covered under the Check 21 legislation, but rather are electronic conversions of the checks' MICR data into an ACH debit. This can help the depositor save on the costs of transporting checks and in bank fees. However, the liability changes from Regulation CC of the Federal Reserve to Regulation E, which provides much more protection for the account being debited and therefore more risk to the merchant and originating bank.

== Patents ==
There are a number of patents relating to "check back collection systems", including some owned by DataTreasury.

== See also ==
- Remote deposit
- Substitute check in United States
