= Substitute check =

With the same legal standing

A substitute check or cheque, also called an image cash letter (ICL), clearing replacement document (CRD), or image replacement document (IRD), is a negotiable instrument used in electronic banking systems to represent a physical paper cheque (check). It may be wholly digital from payment initiation to clearing and settlement or it may be a digital reproduction (truncation) of an original paper check.

== Standards and formats ==
Software providers have developed "Virtual Check 21" standards within electronic banking systems which allows creation and submission of demand draft documents to the bank of deposit.

Standards may include:

- Remotely created checks (RCC)
- X9.37 files

== Geographical significance ==
=== United States ===
The beginnings of substitute checks in the United States were formalized by the Check 21 Act which came into effect in 2004.

== See also ==
- Remote deposit
- Cheque truncation
