= Clearing house (finance) =

Financial institution that provides clearing and settlement services

A clearing house, often written as clearinghouse, is a financial institution formed to facilitate the exchange (i.e., clearance) of payments, securities, or derivatives transactions. The clearing house stands between two clearing firms (also known as member firms or participants).

Its purpose is to reduce the risk of a member firm failing to honor its trade settlement obligations. A clearing house provides emergency lending and assists banks when they need help.

== Description ==
After the legally binding agreement (i.e., execution) of a trade between a buyer and a seller, the role of the clearing house is to centralize and standardize all of the steps leading up to the payment (i.e., settlement) of the transaction. The purpose is to reduce the cost, settlement risk and operational risk of clearing and settling multiple transactions among multiple parties.

In addition to the above services, central counterparty clearing (CCP) takes on counterparty risk by stepping in between the original buyer and seller of a financial contract, such as a derivative. The role of the CCP is to perform the obligations under the contract agreed between the two counterparties, thereby removing the counterparty risk the parties of the contract had to each other and replacing it with counterparty risk to a highly regulated central counterparty that specializes in managing and mitigating counterparty risk. The clearing house mitigates risk by ensuring both parties are financially capable of entering into such a contract, and that parties will receive what they are owed, resulting in a smoother transaction and ultimately a more liquid market.

== History ==
Clearing houses were first proposed in 1636 by Philip Burlamachi, financier to Charles I of England.

=== Bank clearance ===
The origins of clearing houses date back to bank cheque clearing in the 18th century. The London Clearing-House was established between 1750 and 1770 as a place where the clerks of the bankers of the city of London could assemble daily to exchange with one another the cheques drawn upon and bills payable at their respective houses. It replaced a system of clerks visiting every other banker in London.

=== Financial exchanges ===
Financial exchanges, such as commodities futures markets and stock exchanges, began to use clearing houses in the latter part of the 19th century. In 1874 the London Stock Exchange Clearing-House was established for the purpose of settling transactions in stock, the clearing being effected by balance sheets and tickets. The balance of stock to be received or delivered was shown on a balance sheet sent in by each member, and the items are then cancelled against one another and tickets issued for the balances outstanding. As late as 1899, the London Stock Exchange was still the only stock exchange in Europe using a clearing house. The Philadelphia Stock Exchange (founded 1790), the first U.S. stock exchange to use a clearing system, began using a clearing system in 1870, but the much larger New York Stock Exchange (NYSE) still had no clearing system some two decades later in 1891. The Consolidated Stock Exchange of New York used clearing houses from its inception in 1885. This exchange existed in competition with the NYSE from 1885 to 1926 and averaged 23% of NYSE volume. Its competitor Consolidated's use of clearing houses finally forced the NYSE to follow suit (from 1892) to gain the same market advantages of at least prevention of frauds and reneging on bargains. Some major U.S. commodities exchanges, like the New York Coffee Exchange (today the Coffee, Sugar and Cocoa Exchange) and the Chicago Mercantile Exchange did not begin using clearing houses to settle their transactions until the second decade of the 20th century (1914 and 1919, respectively).

=== Other industries ===
The British Railway Clearing House was established in 1842. Its purpose, as defined by the Railway Clearing Act 1850, was "to settle and adjust the receipts arising from railway traffic within, or partly within, the United Kingdom, and passing over more than one railway within the United Kingdom, booked or invoiced at throughout rates or fares." The Irish Railway Clearing-House, established in 1848, had its headquarters in Dublin, and was incorporated by act of Parliament, the Clearing Act (Ireland) 1860 (23 & 24 Vict. c. xxix). In 1888 a society was formed in London called the Beetroot Sugar Association for clearing bargains in sugar from sugar beet, and the London Produce Clearing-House was established in the same year for regulating and adjusting bargains in foreign and colonial produce.

=== Central counterparty clearing ===
Modern central counterparty clearing (CCP) provides clearing services, and also takes on the counterparty risk of the counterparties (member banks and broker-dealers).

== Impact ==
A 2019 study in the Journal of Political Economy found that the establishment of the New York Stock Exchange (NYSE) clearinghouse in 1892 "substantially reduced volatility of NYSE returns caused by settlement risk and increased asset values", indicating "that a clearinghouse can improve market stability and value through a reduction in network contagion and counterparty risk."

== See also ==
- Central securities depository
- Automated clearing house
- National Automated Clearing House
