= National Association of Financial Market Institutional Investors =

Chinese financial body

The National Association of Financial Market Institutional Investors (NAFMII) is a nonprofit self-regulatory organization (SRO) in China with roles as a trade association, financial supervisory authority and financial market infrastructure. Based in Beijing, it was authorized on 24 August 2007 by the Ministry of Civil Affairs, and thus counts as China's first-ever SRO. It is subject to oversight by the People's Bank of China (PBC).

== Overview ==
NAFMII's members include banks, insurers, securities firms, asset managers, credit rating agencies, accounting firms, as well as some non-financial corporations or their financial services arms.

Its inaugural meeting was held on 3 September 2007 in the Great Hall of the People, in the presence of PBC Governor Zhou Xiaochuan together with representatives of the China Banking Regulatory Commission (CBRC), China Insurance Regulatory Commission (CIRC), and China Securities Regulatory Commission (CSRC). Its six founding members were Bank of China, Industrial and Commercial Bank of China (ICBC), China Foreign Exchange Trade System (CFETS), China Central Depository & Clearing (ChinaBond), CITIC Securities, and China Huaneng Group.

NAFMII is the relevant authority for issuance of debt securities by non-financial corporations on the Interbank Bond Market. With respect to such securities, it also acts as a supervisor of Chinese credit rating agencies, as do the CSRC and NDRC for their respective bond market segments.

In 2022, NAFMII was also acknowledged by the Financial Stability Board as a trade repository for credit derivatives, together with CFETS.

== See also ==
- Securities Association of China
- Asset Management Association of China
- National Financial Regulatory Administration
- Liu Jun (banker)
