= China Foreign Exchange Trade System =

Financial infrastructure in China

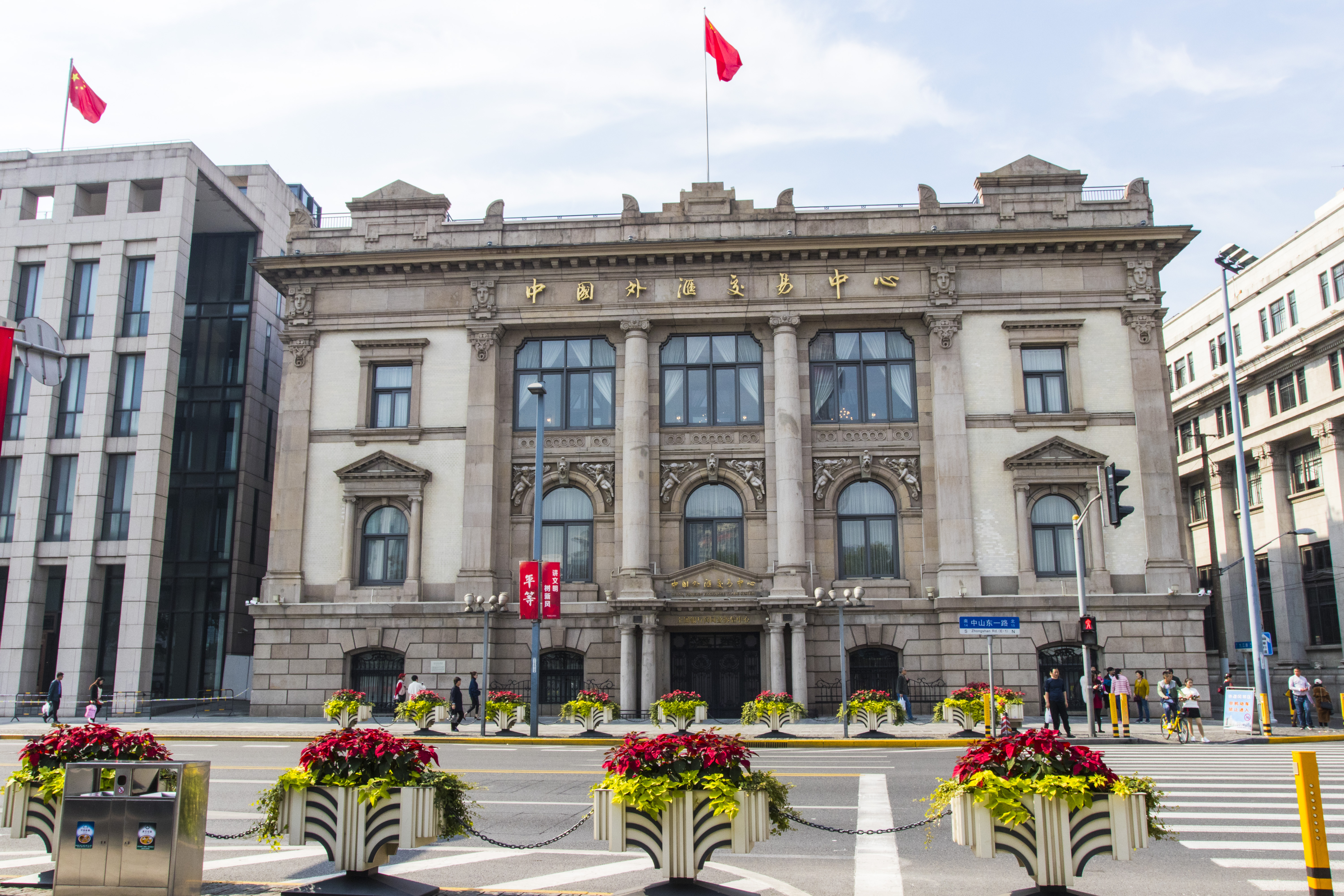
Backup center of CFETS at No.15 Bund in Shanghai, originally built 1902 for the Russo-Chinese Bank

The China Foreign Exchange Trade System (CFETS; Chinese: 中國外匯交易中心), also known as National Interbank Funding Center (NIFC; Chinese: 全国银行间同业拆借中心), is a financial market infrastructure and electronic trading platform in China, established in 1994 in Shanghai under the People's Bank of China (PBC).

CFETS provides a major trading platform and pricing center for renminbi and foreign exchange-related products. It is the trading platform of the China Interbank Bond Market (though not for the Chinese repo market, which is traded on the Shanghai Stock Exchange) and participates in China's policy of internationalization of the renminbi. In 2022, it was acknowledged by the Financial Stability Board as a trade repository for credit, foreign-exchange, and interest-rate derivatives.

== Overview ==
CFETS was created by the PBC on 18 April 1994, initially as the Forex Trading System (Chinese: 外汇交易系统), intended to facilitate liquidity for transactions pairing the renminbi with Japanese yen, British pound, New Zealand dollar, Swiss franc, Malaysian ringgit, South African rand, United Arab Emirates dirham, Hungarian forint, Danish krone, Norwegian krone, and Mexican peso. In 1996, its scope was expanded to interbank funding, in 1997 to the interbank bond market, and in 2005 to interest-rate and foreign exchange derivatives. It is a not-for-profit entity owned by the PBC, officially described as a "sub-institution directly affiliated to the PBC".

CFETS also operated a central counterparty until 2009, when that role was transferred to the Shanghai Clearing House.

CFETS has been based since 2006 in Zhangjiang Town, Shanghai, with a local backup center on the Bund and a remote backup center in Beijing. It also has sub-centers in Guangzhou, Shenzhen, Tianjin, Jinan, Dalian, Nanjing, Xiamen, Qingdao, Wuhan, Chongqing, Chengdu, Zhuhai, Shantou, Fuzhou, Ningbo, Xi'an, Shenyang, and Haikou.

CFETS self-describes as undertaking daily monitoring on market transactions, and also providing support and service for the PBC monetary policy transmission and market self-regulatory organizations. It publishes market benchmarks, including RMB Central Parity Rate, Shanghai Interbank Offered Rate (Shibor), CFETS RMB Index, Loan Prime Rate (LPR), RMB Reference Rate, Bond Indices, yield curves, etc., offering reference prices for the market. In 2018, trading volume on CFETS exceeded RMB 1 trillion. It served more than 20,000 domestic market trading members, more than 800 overseas institutions, and over 42,000 information and regulatory users. Overseas members include central banks and sovereign wealth funds.

== Leadership ==
Pei Chuanzhi was the president of CFETS in the mid-2010s. As of early 2024, the CFETS President was Zhang Yi.

== See also ==
- China Central Depository & Clearing (CCDC)
- China Securities Depository and Clearing Corporation (CSDC)
- Cross-Border Interbank Payment System (CIPS)
- National Association of Financial Market Institutional Investors (NAFMII)
- Society for Worldwide Interbank Financial Telecommunication (SWIFT)
- CLS Group
