= Central Moneymarkets Unit =

Financial market infrastructure in Hong Kong

- Company type: Subsidiary
- Industry: Financial services
- Founded: 1990; 36 years ago
- Headquarters: Hong Kong, China
- Area served: Hong Kong
- Products: Central counterparty clearing house and central securities depository
- Owner: Hong Kong Monetary Authority
- Website: www.hkma.gov.hk/eng/key-functions/international-financial-centre/financial-market-infrastructure/debt-securities-settlement-system/

The Central Moneymarkets Unit (CMU) is a central counterparty clearing house (CCP) and central securities depository (CSD) for fixed-income securities, owned and operated by the Hong Kong Monetary Authority (HKMA) in Hong Kong.

It complements the CCP and CSD infrastructures of Hong Kong Exchanges and Clearing (HKEX) for equities, options and derivatives.

== History ==
The CMU started in 1990 with clearing and settlement services for bills and notes of Hong Kong's Exchange Fund. It extended them in late 1993 to other Hong Kong dollar-denominated fixed-income securities, and in early 1996 debt securities in other currencies. In December 1996, CMU was connected with Hong Kong's CHATS real-time gross settlement system for transactions in Hong Kong dollars, thus providing delivery versus payment in local central bank money.

Similar connections were made to the respective CHATS systems for transactions in US dollar in December 2000, euro in April 2003, and Japanese yen in March 2006.

In 2001, the CMU joined the Asia-Pacific Central Securities Depository Group (ACG), and in 2024, the International Securities Services Association (ISSA).

== CMU OmniClear and ICSD development ==
CMU OmniClear is a fully owned subsidiary of the Exchange Fund, incorporated in October 2024. It is tasked with the development of CMU into an expanded role that would potentially challenge the duopoly of Euroclear Bank and Clearstream Banking SA as international central securities depositories (ICSDs). The ICSD ambition was announced on 4 March 2025 as a joint venture between CMU OmniClear and HKEX.

HKMA, however, insists that it remains the owner and operator of CMU, keeps all contractual relationships with CMU participants, and retains decision-making authority over "policy and strategic development regarding CMU's activities and services".

A few days after the ICSD announcement, CMU OmniClear joined the Pan Asia Securities Lending Association (PASLA).

== See also ==
- China Central Depository & Clearing
- Financial market infrastructure
