= China Interbank Bond Market =

Bond market in China

China Inter-Bank Bond Market
- Native name: 银行间债券市场
- Founded: 1997
- Parent: People's Bank of China

The China Interbank Bond Market (CIBM; Chinese: 银行间债券市场) is the largest domestic bond market in China and, as of 2022, is the second-largest in the world, only trailing the United States bond market. The CIBM has over US$21.5 trillion in outstanding volume as of the end of 2022. The CIBM was formed in 1997 after the People's Bank of China (PBOC) mandated commercial banks to move their bond trading out of the stock exchanges and into an interbank market operating through an electronic trading system.

The CIBM has grown rapidly since its inception. Average daily turnover has increased by over 400% in the past 12 years. In 2016 for the first time, medium and long-term qualified foreign institutional investors recognized by People's Bank of China were allowed to invest in the CIBM without quota limits. In March 2022, overseas institutional investors made up 2.9 percent of the outstanding volume of bonds under custody in CIBM.

== Market infrastructure and major participants ==
The CIBM is an over-the-counter market between institutional investors. The trading system was developed by the China Foreign Exchange Trade System (CFETS). CFETS provides trade processing, training, and benchmark services for the CIBM, monitoring transactions, and providing support for monetary policy transmission of the People's Bank of China. The Shanghai Clearing House and China Central Depository & Clearing Co., Ltd. provide market participants with bond ownership, transaction information, and clearing and settlement services. With the authorization of the People's Bank of China, the Interbank Center and China Central Depository & Clearing Corporation may disclose market-related information.

| Name | Main Functions | Fixed-income Products |
|---|---|---|
| China Foreign Exchange Trade System | Trade repository, facilitating over-the-counter trading | All products traded on the CIBM |
| Shanghai Clearing House | Registration, depository, clearing and settlement | Chinese government bonds, central bank bills, financial bonds, and enterprise bonds. |
| China Central Depository & Clearing | Registration, depository, clearing and settlement | credit risk mitigations, debt financing instruments, Negotiable Certificate Deposits |

== International Market Access Channels and Bond Connect ==
As early as 2010, the People's Bank of China started a pilot program for select overseas participants to invest in the CIBM. By 2013 this expanded to qualified foreign institutional investors with set quotas. By 2016 they could invest without set quotas.

In 2017, Bond Connect was launched, providing greater convenience for overseas investors as well as increase the scope of investable products. Bond Connect provided overseas investors real-time delivery versus payment as well as access via mainstream international e-trading platforms. With the addition of Bond Connect, bonds in the CIBM were included in Bloomberg Global Aggregate Indices, which took effect in April 2019. This allowed for exchange traded funds like KraneShares Bloomberg China Bond Inclusion ETF.

== See also ==
- National Association of Financial Market Institutional Investors
