= Cnaps =

Cnaps may refer to:

- CNaPS Sport, football club
- CNAPS code, used in China.
