= Internationalization of the renminbi =

Economic process in China

- Traditional Chinese: 人民幣國際化
- Simplified Chinese: 人民币国际化
Transcriptions
Standard Mandarin
- Hanyu Pinyin: rénmínbì guójìhuà

Since the late 2000s, the People's Republic of China (PRC) has sought to internationalize its official currency, the renminbi (RMB) or Chinese yuan (CNY). This initiative aims to reduce dependence on the United States dollar and enhance China's influence in the global financial system. Key strategies have included promoting the use of the yuan in international trade invoicing, cross-border lending, and bond issuance. Additionally, China has developed alternative payment systems such as the Cross-Border Interbank Payment System (CIPS) and the digital renminbi, facilitating transactions outside traditional networks like SWIFT. The establishment of central bank swap lines and the expansion of offshore yuan markets further support this goal.

The internationalization of the RMB is still a work in progress. Key factors include China's large and stable economy, strong government support, and gradual opening of deep, well-regulated capital markets. Official efforts, such as establishing RMB clearing banks in 25 countries, have increased global use and reduced transaction costs. By early 2020, the RMB's share of global foreign exchange reserves reached a record 2.02%, reflecting its growing role as a reserve currency.

== Development ==
Until the early 2000s, the RMB was not convertible and its flow in and out of China was tightly restricted. The first step toward liberalisation came in 2004, when China began allowing limited border trade settlements in yuan. That same year, banks in Hong Kong were permitted to offer RMB deposit-taking, exchange, remittance, and card services for personal accounts, following approval by the State Council and arrangements with the Hong Kong Monetary Authority. By 2009, RMB deposits in Hong Kong had risen from ¥12 billion in 2004 to ¥59 billion, and the territory emerged as the largest offshore centre for RMB activity.

The internationalisation push accelerated after the 2008 financial crisis. In July 2007, China Development Bank issued the first offshore RMB-denominated bonds in Hong Kong, creating the "dim sum bond" market, which expanded rapidly as banks, corporations such as McDonald’s, and supranational institutions like the Asian Development Bank issued debt in offshore RMB (CNH). By 2013, the market had grown to ¥310 billion outstanding. In parallel, Taiwan developed a Formosa bond market after signing a 2012 memorandum with Beijing, and similar RMB bond issuance spread to Singapore and other centres.

On 24 December 2008, China launched the Cross-Border Trade RMB Settlement Pilot Project, initially limited to Yunnan–ASEAN and Guangdong–Hong Kong–Macau trade. By 2010, the pilot expanded to 20 provinces, municipalities and autonomous regions, and by 2014 RMB settlements reached ¥5.9 trillion, or 22% of China's trade volume.

From 2009 onward, the People's Bank of China signed a growing number of currency swap agreements with central banks, covering countries such as Argentina, Brazil, Turkey, South Korea, and the UK. In August 2010, the PBoC allowed central banks and offshore clearing banks to invest surplus RMB in the onshore China Interbank Bond Market, and soon afterwards permitted outward direct investment in RMB. That year, China and Russia began trading in their own currencies, abandoning the United States dollar in bilateral trade, followed by a similar arrangement with Japan in 2011. In December 2011, the Renminbi Qualified Foreign Institutional Investor programme was introduced to allow offshore RMB funds to invest in mainland securities markets.

China also experimented with financial reforms through the Shanghai Free-Trade Zone, launched in 2013, where RMB could circulate more freely between Free Trade Accounts and offshore accounts. In the same year, the UK became the first G7 country to establish an official RMB swap line. By late 2013, the RMB had overtaken the euro to become the second-most used currency in global trade finance, behind only the U.S. dollar.

Between 2014 and 2017, a series of liberalisations deepened offshore RMB use. The Shanghai–Hong Kong Stock Connect was launched in 2014 to allow cross-border equity trading, followed in 2017 by Bond Connect to link mainland and Hong Kong bond markets. The China International Payments System was established in 2015 as an alternative to SWIFT, and the World Bank issued the first SDR bonds payable in RMB in 2016. In 2018, yuan-denominated oil futures were introduced on the Shanghai International Energy Exchange, marking a step toward pricing commodities in RMB.

Further reforms removed barriers for inbound investors: in September 2019 the State Administration of Foreign Exchange abolished quotas under the Qualified Foreign Institutional Investor and RQFII programmes, and in 2020 the two schemes were merged with simplified application and expanded investment scope. By 2020, the RMB accounted for 4.3% of global foreign exchange turnover and was held in reserves by more than 70 central banks, though it remained used for less than 2% of global payments.

== Renminbi hubs outside China ==
Since the late 2000s, China has encouraged the creation of offshore hubs for the RMB to expand its international use. Early initiatives included bilateral swap agreements and the designation of clearing banks in major financial centres. In Asia, Hong Kong and Macau became the first and largest offshore markets, with RMB deposits, trade settlement, and bond issuance expanding rapidly after 2010. Singapore followed with the designation of ICBC as a clearing bank in 2013, bilateral swap facilities, and the launch of direct CNY/SGD trading in 2014. Taiwan and South Korea also established clearing arrangements with Bank of China (Taipei) and Bank of Communications (Seoul), while Japan began direct RMB–yen trading in 2012. Russia developed RMB–rouble trading on the Moscow Exchange starting in 2010, with turnover growing steadily through the 2010s. In 2025 Turkey signed an agreement with China to create a clearing system after earlier currency-swap cooperation.

In Europe, London quickly became the leading European hub, accounting for over 60% of RMB activity outside China by 2013 and later ranking second globally in RMB settlements via SWIFT. Frankfurt was designated an official clearing centre in 2014, reflecting Germany's role as China's largest EU trading partner. Paris and Luxembourg also grew as centres for RMB deposits and bond issuance, with Luxembourg emerging as the leading RMB securities settlement venue in Europe. Switzerland signed a swap line with China in 2014, expanding European access to RMB. In the Americas, Canada became the first country to sign a reciprocal currency deal with China in 2014, enabling direct trading between the Canadian dollar and the yuan. In the Pacific, Australia signed a swap agreement with the PBoC in 2012, established clearing arrangements by 2014, and invested part of its foreign reserves in RMB-denominated bonds.

By the mid-2020s, this network of offshore hubs stretching across Asia, Europe, North America, and Australia had created multiple channels for RMB clearing, bond issuance, and foreign exchange trading.

Appointed Date	Market	Clearing Bank	Clearing hour (GMT)
24 December 2003	Hong Kong	BoC, Hong Kong	00:30-21:00
September 2004	Macau	BoC, Macau branch	
11 December 2012	Taiwan	BoC, Taipei branch	
8 February 2013	Singapore	ICBC, Singapore branch	
18 June 2014	UK	CCB, London branch	
19 June 2014	Germany	BoC, Frankfurt branch	
4 July 2014	South Korea	BoCom, Seoul branch	
15 September 2014	France	BoC, Paris Branch	
16 September 2014	Luxembourg	ICBC, Luxembourg	
3 November 2014	Qatar	ICBC, Doha	
8 November 2014	Canada	ICBC, Toronto	
17 November 2014	Australia	BoC, Sydney	
6 January 2015	Thailand	ICBC, Bangkok	
6 January 2015	Malaysia	BoC, Malaysia	
25 May 2015	Chile	CCB, Santiago	
28 June 2015	Hungary	BoC, Budapest	
9 July 2015	South Africa	BoC, Johannesburg	
17 September 2015	Argentina	ICBC, Buenos Aires	
30 September 2015	Zambia	BoC, Lusaka	
30 November 2015	Switzerland	CCB, Zurich	
21 September 2016	USA	BoC, NYC	
September 2016	Russia	ICBC, Moscow	
December 2016	UAE	ABC, Dubai	

== RMB Bilateral Swap Agreements ==
Earliest agreement	Economic partner	Max. value in foreign currency (including extensions)	Max. value in RMB (including extensions)
12 December 2008	South Korea	KRW 64 trillion	¥360 billion
25 November 2020	Hong Kong	HKD 590 billion	¥500 billion
8 February 2009	Malaysia	MYR 90 billion	¥180 billion
11 March 2009	Belarus	BYR 16 trillion	¥7 billion
23 March 2009	Indonesia	IDR 878 trillion	¥400 billion
29 March 2009	Argentina	ARS 38 billion	¥70 billion
9 June 2010	Iceland	ISK 66 billion	¥3.5 billion
23 July 2010	Singapore	SGD 60 billion	¥300 billion
18 April 2011	New Zealand	NZD 5 billion	¥25 billion
19 April 2011	Uzbekistan	UZS 167 billion	¥0.7 billion
6 May 2011	Mongolia	MNT 2 trillion	¥15 billion
13 June 2011	Kazakhstan	KZT 150 billion	¥7 billion
23 June 2011	Russian Federation	RUB 815 billion	¥150 billion
22 December 2011	Thailand	THB 320 billion	¥70 billion
23 December 2011	Pakistan	PKR 140 billion	¥10 billion
17 January 2012	United Arab Emirates	AED 20 billion	¥35 billion
21 February 2012	Turkey	TRY 189 billion	¥35 billion
22 March 2012	Australia	AUD 30 billion	¥200 billion
26 June 2012	Ukraine	UAH 19 billion	¥15 billion
26 March 2013	Brazil	BRL 60 billion	¥190 billion
22 June 2013	United Kingdom	GBP 21 billion	¥200 billion
9 September 2013	Hungary	HUF 375 billion	¥10 billion
12 September 2013	Albania	ALL 35.8 billion	¥2 billion
9 October 2013	European Union	EUR 45 billion	¥350 billion
21 July 2014	Switzerland	CHF 21 billion	¥150 billion
16 September 2014	Sri Lanka	LKR 225 billion	¥10 billion
3 November 2014	Qatar	QAR 20.8 billion	¥35 billion
8 November 2014	Canada	CAD 30 billion	¥200 billion
23 December 2014	Nepal	NPR	¥ billion
18 March 2015	Suriname	SRD 520 million	¥ 1 billion
10 April 2015	South Africa	ZAR 54 billion	¥ 30 billion
25 May 2015	Chile	CLP 2.2 trillion	¥ 22 billion
5 September 2015	Tajikistan	TJS 3.2 billion	¥ 3.2 billion
5 December 2019	Macau	MOP 35 billion	¥ 30 billion
20 November 2023	Saudi Arabia	SAR 26 billion	¥ 50 billion
Total (excluding Nepal)			¥3,489 billion

== See also ==
- List of Chinese banks
- List of countries by leading trade partners
- List of the largest trading partners of China
- Renminbi currency value
- Monetary policy of China
