= History of monetary policy in China =

From 221 BCE

The history of monetary policy in China involves the evolution of the Chinese government's monetary policies from different imperial dynasties to the modern reforms created and employed by the Chinese Communist Party (CCP). China's monetary system changed significantly during the imperial period, moving from bronze coins to paper currency long before Europe did. In ancient times, various monetary theories emerged with the development of paper and metal money.

Monetary policy in China was wholly based on the sovereign's authority during the imperial period. During the late Qing period, the financial sector began to expand with the private sector issuing their own paper currency. By the Republic period, currency creation and circulation moved away from traditional private banks to state and quasi-state institutions. Chiang Kai-shek's reforms in 1935 centralized the Chinese monetary system while moving away from the silver standard. With the establishment of the People's Republic of China, monetary policy followed the Soviet Union's system until China's reform and opening up.

== Early to middle imperial China ==
=== Unified system of currency ===
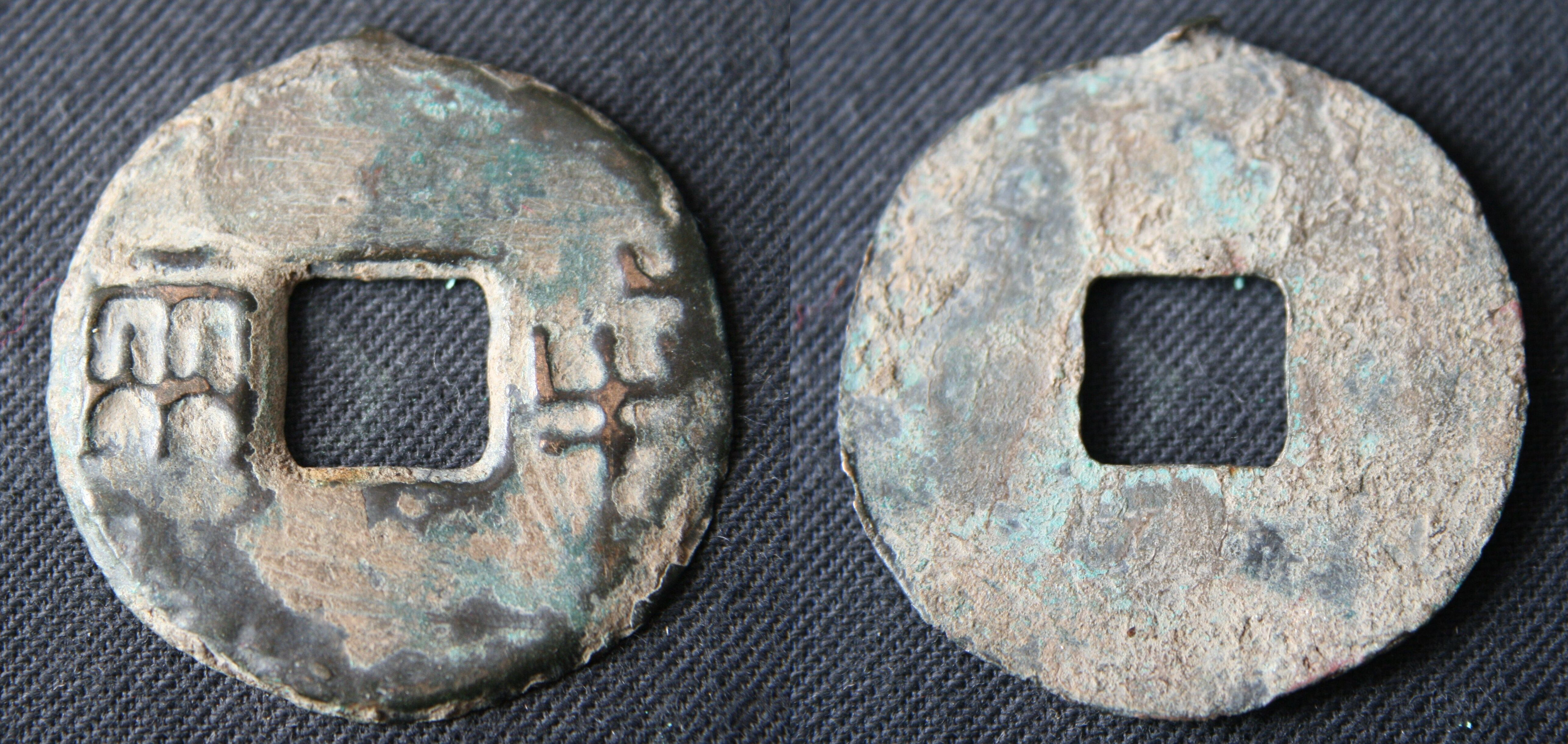
Banliang coin from the Qin dynasty

Qin Shi Huang, first emperor of the Qin dynasty, unified China in 221 B.C.E. and focused on centralizing the economy. Despite being against commerce, the Qin government saw the importance of money for managing resources. The emperor established a unified currency system with two types of currency: gold and bronze coins. Other valuable items like pearls and jade were limited to specific uses and could not be used as money for trade. The Qin introduced a new bronze coin called "Banliang", worth four times more than previous knife-money, and a twenty-ounce gold ingot known as "Yi". The need for an international currency diminished with the end of the Warring States period.

=== State-controlled coinage ===
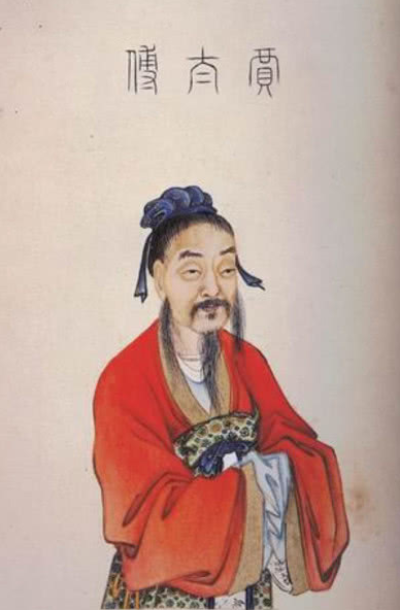
Jia Yi, politician and counsellor of the Han dynasty

The Han dynasty, began in 202 B.C.E., chose a loose money policy to increase the money supply. In 182 B.C.E., the Han reduced the weight of its coins by 80%, leading to inflation. This prompted the dynasty to increase the metallic content of coins in 175 B.C.E, although the new coins were still lighter than before. The court also allowed the minting of private coins, which went against previous guidelines. Counselor Jia Yi criticized this decision, arguing it would lead people to neglect agriculture for profit in trade and mining. He claimed free coinage created confusion in the marketplace and could cause further inflation, making life harder for consumers. Jia insisted that coinage should only be controlled by the ruler. Even Sima Qian, who usually supported free economic policies, believed that coinage should only be controlled by the government.

In the early Han period, princes and ministers who benefited from free coinage became very wealthy, rivaling the emperor's wealth, which led to unrest. Therefore, Emperor Wu, who ruled from 141-87 B.C.E., reinstated the government's control over coinage in 113 B.C.E. He also created various fiat currencies to fund his expensive foreign wars. Despite his efforts, attempts to prevent counterfeiting failed, but under his rule, the Han introduced the "Wushu" coin in 118 B.C.E., which became the main currency until the seventh century. Emperor Wu's monetary policies became the major theme in the court debates of his successor in 81 B.C.E, known as the "Salt and Iron Debates". Arguments against the state monopoly on coinage were not favored by future monarchs. The court debate in 81 B.C.E. was the final major challenge to sovereign currency. During the Period of Disunion and the Tang dynasty, ideas of free coinage arose among statesmen but were quickly rejected.

== Late imperial China ==
=== Paper currency ===
In the Song dynasty, bronze coin was the main currency, while iron coin and paper money were seen as lesser. However, in the Yuan dynasty, paper money became the primary currency, with coins viewed as secondary. This change happened because paper money was issued in large amounts. By the mid-Ming dynasty period, silver took over as the main currency, and later exchanges between silver and coin were regulated.

==== Issues with paper money ====
To ensure stable exchange rates between different currencies, Song statesmen relied on the quantity theorem from Guanzi. They believed that monetary authorities must control the emission of bronze coins and paper currency to maintain stable ratios. Confidence in paper currency depended on the government's promise to convert it into hard currency. While principles of convertibility and stability were essential for a sound currency system, they were often ignored due to excessive issuance of paper money for deficit spending.

By the thirteenth century, people lost trust in paper money, challenging the idea that currency was strictly controlled by the state. The Southern Song government began printing large amounts of paper currency to manage its debt, leading many officials to shift from chartalism to metallism, as faith in state power weakened after the fall of Wang Anshi's reforms.

==== Attempts on reviving paper money ====
Zhu Yuanzhang, first emperor of Ming

The Ming dynasty's approach to money focused on using it as a tool for collecting revenue and keeping prices stable. They prioritized a fiat currency because it gave them control. The state was not concerned with the intrinsic value of money, such as a coin's metal content, as this could hinder the states' economic goals. Even after the Yuan dynasty's paper money suffered from inflation, the concept of a government-backed currency remained respected in Chinese political thought. Ming writer Ye Ziqi (c.1327 - 1390) argued in 1378 that paper money was not inherently flawed, he blamed the Yuan dynasty's policies for the currency's collapse. He stressed that for paper money to be successful, it had to be backed by sufficient reserves of precious metals or coins, a principle the Ming state embraced by making its paper currency convertible with coin.

Unlike the Yuan, the Ming aimed to supplement their paper notes with bronze coins. However, the Ming's "baochao" paper currency was nonconvertible from the start as it could not be exchanged for hard currency like silver, a precious metal gaining attraction from merchants in trade. This differed from the Yuan, which initially backed its paper money with silver. The lack of convertibility caused a significant gap between the paper money's nominal value and its actual market value. Under Emperor Zhu Yuanzhang, the Ming government's monetary policy was erratic. It tried to stop the use of silver in trade, but the paper money continued to lose value, even compared to coins. The state's response was inconsistent. For instance, creation of mints were opened and closed, and the printing of new paper money was frequently stopped and restarted during the 1370s and 1380s. This "tinkering" failed to halt the currency's depreciation. By 1390, the one-guan note was worth only a quarter of its face value, but the emperor resisted pressure to devalue it.

The Yongle Emperor tried to keep the monetary policies of his father by banning silver and issuing more paper money, however, retreated into issuing coins. His successor, Xuande Emperor, continued promoting the "baochao" as the fiat currency which also became unsuccessful. During the final years of his reign, many Chinese regions eventually adopted silver as their main currency. In 1436, Beijing started paying their military officers with silver. That same year, Huang Fu, minister of revenue, proposed to use silver as reserves backing the paper currency but no action was taken from the government. The government then lifted their ban on the precious metal.

=== Qing dynasty ===
By the half of the 19th century, the Qing central government started to experiment with new forms of currency. This included printing paper money and minting coins with a higher value than a single cash coin. Around 1880, they began to produce machine-struck coins in the Western style, specifically in brass and silver.

==== Establishment of government banks and currency measures ====
In 1895, the Qing court created provincial government banks that could issue paper money. Shanxi had two local banks: the Jintai Official Bureau in Taiyuan in 1902 and a bank in Suiyuan in 1904. These banks aimed to provide enough money to avoid cash shortages and stabilize silver and copper exchange rates. However, the Taiyuan bank was for-profit and fully managed by merchants, with no government interference.

In 1909, the central government issued regulations that banned private entities from creating paper money. They established a monopoly for state banks on issuing convertible paper. Some temporary rules allowed private paper to circulate but limited the amount that could be issued and set requirements for banks. The Qing goal was to unify the currency through state banks like the Bank of Communications and the Great Qing Bank.

Despite these regulations, their impact varied locally. Shortly after the new rules were introduced, the Sichuanese provincial Office of Industrial Promotion directed regional governments to proceed slowly with implementing the measures, arguing that people were used to private notes and changes should not happen too quickly. This local response showed that the central government's efforts were not as powerful on the ground. The Qing was unable to create a unified currency system.

== Republic of China (1912–1949) ==
During the Republic period, private banks and state control became prominent issues. By 1926, there were 52 banks in China, increasing to 164 before World War II. During the warlord period (1915-1928), warlord leaders like those in Yunnan and Shanxi controlled local financial systems. The currency issued by the Fudian Bank in Yunnan became the sole currency in the province, while Yan Xishan in Shanxi reorganized a private bank to issue banknotes under his control. Although he tried to eliminate private currency and unify it under the silver dollar standard, success was limited. After suffering a defeat in 1930 against Chiang Kai-shek, Yan's currency lost value, leading to a return of private note printing until reorganization. In the 1920s, local governments began issuing more notes, while private company notes became rare, shifting the focus to local money.

=== Foreign exchange reserves ===
In 1935, Chiang Kai-shek's Central Government unified China's currency due to a financial crisis caused by the US Silver Purchase Act of 1934. This led to falling prices, threatened bank failures, and a recession. To prevent this, the government introduced a new currency called "fabi", which was not backed by silver. The government also sought to stabilize exchange rates and maintained a foreign exchange reserves. The reforms succeeded, and fabi became widely accepted, while private notes and local currencies were mainly issued by local governments or cooperatives.

== People's Republic of China ==
=== Soviet-style monetary policy ===
In a developed market economy, the central bank manages liquidity by influencing bank assets and liabilities through methods like changing the discount rate, reserve requirements, or open market operations. These actions impact resource allocation influenced by market forces. In contrast, pre-1979 China had a different system where the Planning Commission decided resource allocation, with monetary policy aimed at supporting this plan through a budget, credit plan, and cash plan. The credit plan outlined the credit needed by various regions and businesses to meet their output goals. It specified overall credit amounts but was managed according to the "commodity inventory system," established in 1955. This system allowed credit to be given based on specific plans, purposes, and inventory levels. Enterprises had to repay loans quickly when commodities were moved, ensuring that only necessary credit was provided. The banking sector needed to oversee credit use closely.

The responsibility for funding enterprises was divided between the government budget and the banking sector, a system established in the Soviet Union during the 1930s. The budget provided all investment funds and the minimum working capital that enterprises needed, while banks offered additional short-term working capital as needed. Banks charged low interest rates to attract household savings but did not provide investment funds. The profits from state enterprises were owned by the state, which controlled how those funds were used. Therefore, the budget did not charge interest or require repayment, as it already claimed all enterprise profits. The budget ensured that the working capital provided was just enough for operations, while banks managed the timing of cash flows, ensuring stability through controlled credit provision according to a "commodity inventory system."

The People's Bank of China (PBC) served as the de-facto monopoly bank during the 1950s. Before reforms, the banking sector's structure changed often. Banking operations were sometimes centralized under the PBC, while other times specialized banks operated under its supervision. The role and independence of banks also changed with economic policy shifts.

=== Deng Xiaoping's reforms ===
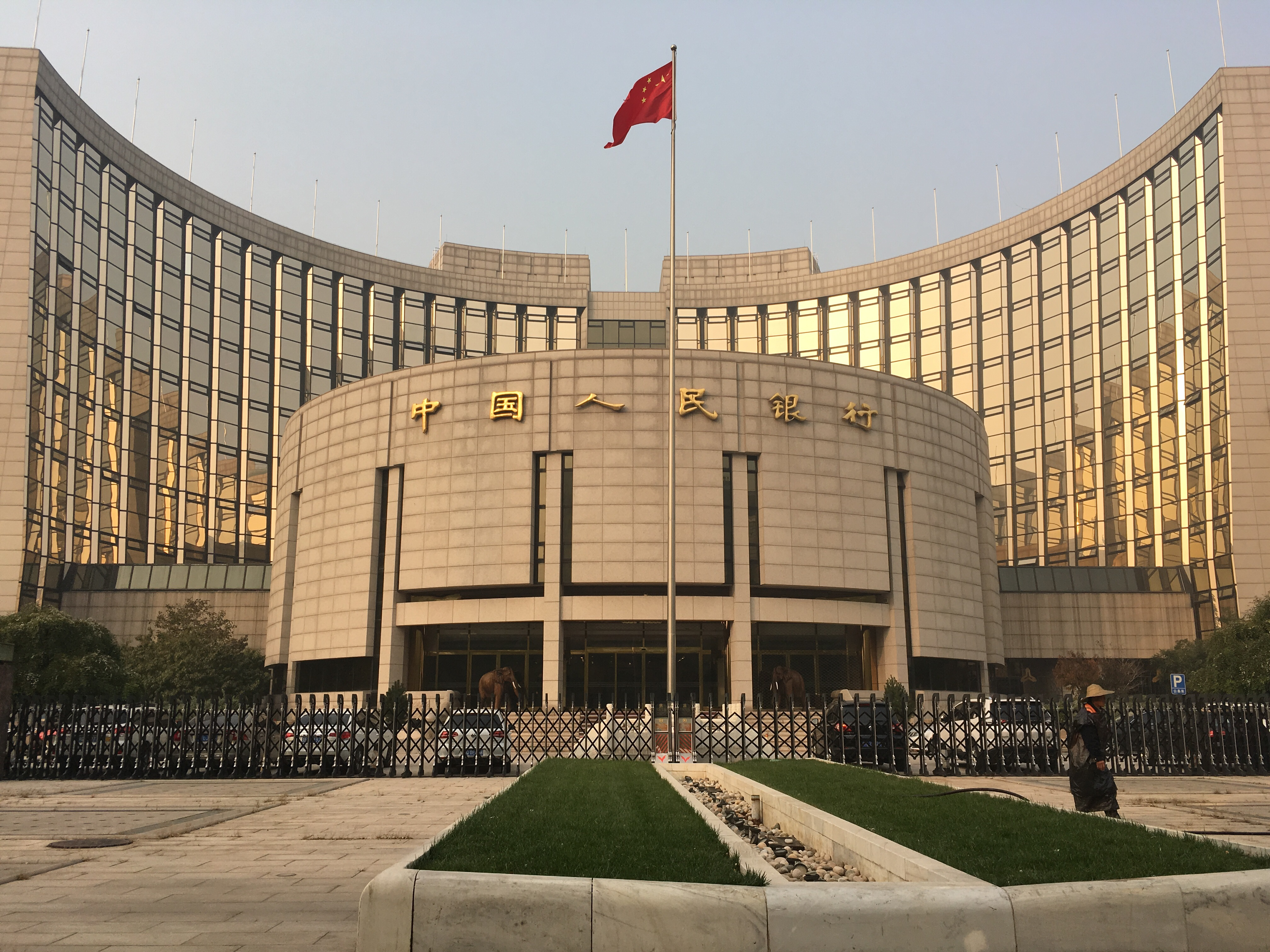
Headquarters of the People's Bank of China in Beijing

Between 1979 and 1984, China's banking system began to change to improve monetary policy for economic stability and resource efficiency. In 1980, local branches of the People's Bank of China (PBC) received more independence in their lending. The Agricultural Bank of China was re-established to manage rural banking, and rural credit cooperatives were given a larger role in providing credit. The Bank of China gained more freedom in financing foreign trade and increased its lending in both domestic and foreign currencies. The People's Construction Bank of China started giving loans based on its deposits instead of just disbursing budget funds.

In 1979, the China International Trade and Investment Corporation was created to encourage joint ventures with foreign investors, providing loans and some equity support. Some provinces also set up trusts to attract foreign investments and made small loans based on bond issues. Additionally, domestic trust and investment corporations were formed to invest surplus financial resources.

By January 1984, the PBC became the designated central bank, and its commercial functions were handed over to the new Industrial and Commercial Bank of China.

=== Late 20th century and the 21st century ===
In 1995, the PBC was legally recognized as China's central bank. It began open market operations in 1996. In the late 1980s and 1990s, the PBC started to use asset-liability management to replace the credit plan. This approach allowed banks to lend a percentage of their total deposits, giving them more flexibility and encouraging deposit growth. With more joint-stock and smaller banks emerging, this method also aimed to reduce the central bank's control costs. Initially tested with the Bank of Communications, by late 1993, all banks had to follow asset-liability management along with the credit plan. By January 1, 1998, the credit plan was completely replaced by this new method.

A banking regulatory commission was formed in 2003, and in 2005, the RMB peg to the USD ended. From 2006, the PBC used RRR to manage foreign exchange inflows.

== See also ==
- History of monetary policy in the United States
- Monetary policy of China
- History of Chinese currency
- History of banking in China
