= CNAPS code =

Bank code in China

The CNAPS code is a code used in China's domestic payment system for the yuan (CNY). It is developed by the People's Bank of China to simplify fund transfers and clearing between banks within the country. CNAPS codes are named after the China National Advanced Payment System.

== Overview ==
Each bank, including foreign ones, is assigned a unique 12-digit CNAPS code from the People's Bank of China, typically starting with "C/N". Remitting banks use this code to directly transfer funds through CNAPS to the recipient's bank account and vice versa. Because each branch has its own CNAPS code, it ensures precise and efficient domestic payments and cuts down on transfer time.

The CNAPS code is mandatory for all CNY transfers within China.

== See also ==
- China National Advanced Payment System
