= China Futures Market Monitoring Center =

Chinese financial sector body

- China Futures Margin Monitoring Center
- 中国期货市场监控中心
- Formation: May 18, 2006; 20 years ago
- Founder: State Council of China
- Type: Non-profit government agency
- Location: Beijing, China
- Region served: China
- Services: Trade repository for commodities and equity derivatives
- Official language: Chinese
- Affiliations: China Securities Regulatory Commission (CSRC)
- Website: www.cfmmc.com

The China Futures Market Monitoring Center (CFMMC), sometimes also referred to as the China Futures Margin Monitoring Center, is a financial market infrastructure organization in China.

The CFMMC operates one of two trade repositories for commodities and equity derivatives in China, together with the China Securities Internet System (CSIS).

== History ==
The CFMMC was established on 18 May 2006. It is one of 19 organizations affiliated with the China Securities Regulatory Commission (CSRC) that support its work, formally a non-profit organization established by the State Council.

== See also ==
- China futures market
