= Securities Association of China =

Membership organization in China

The Securities Association of China (SAC; Chinese: 中国证券业协会) is a self-regulatory organization for securities industry established according to the provisions of the "Securities Law of the People's Republic of China" and the "Administrative Regulations on the Registration of Public Organizations". SAC is a non-profit social institutional legal person function under the guidance and supervision of the China Securities Regulatory Commission (CSRC) and the Ministry of Civil Affairs of China.

The SAC is one of three major membership organizations under the CSRC, together with the China Futures Association (CFA) and Asset Management Association of China (ACAM).

== History ==
The was founded in SAC August 28, 1991 under its Articles of Association with principles of "Legitimate, Supervision, Self-regulation and Normalization".

Under the supervision and direction of CSRC, SAC relies on its members to discharge its 3 major functions: "Self-regulation, Bridging and Service".

== Board of directors ==
The board of directors is the executive body. SAC operates under the Chairman Responsibility System. On 22 January 2007, Mr. Huang Xiangping was elected as the chairman in the fourth Member General Meeting.

By May 1, 2007, SAC has 299 members in total, including:

- 109 Securities Companies
- 51 fund management companies
- 92 securities investment consulting institutions
- 3 assets managements companies
- 44 special members (2 stock exchanges, 1 securities depository and clear company, 8 fund custodian institutions and 33 local securities associations)

== Objectives ==
- Conducting self-regulation over securities industry under the government's centralized and comprehensive supervision and management;
- Bridging between the Government and the industry;
- Providing services to members, protecting the lawful rights and interests of members;
- Maintaining fair competition order in securities industry, promoting transparency, justice and fairness of the securities market and push forward healthy and steady development of the securities market.

== China Securities Internet System ==
The SAC administers the China Securities Internet System Co., Ltd. (CSIS), a financial market infrastructure approved by the CSRC on 27 February 2013. CSIS is acknowledged by the Financial Stability Board as a trade repository for commodities and equity derivatives, together with the China Futures Market Monitoring Center (CFMMC).

== See also ==
- National Association of Financial Market Institutional Investors
