= FMIA =

FMIA may refer to:

- Federal Meat Inspection Act, an American law on food safety
- Financial Market Infrastructure Act, Swiss legislation for the regulation of financial markets
