= Crutzen =

Crutzen is a surname. Notable people with the surname include:

- Benoit Crutzen (born 1972), Belgian economist
- Paul J. Crutzen (1933–2021), Dutch meteorologist and atmospheric chemist

== See also ==
- 9679 Crutzen, a minor planet
