= China National Clearing Center =

Financial infrastructure in China

The China National Clearing Center (also CNCC; Chinese: 中国人民银行清算总中心, lit. 'People's Bank of China Clearing Center') is a non-profit public institution created in May 1990 that is administered by the People's Bank of China and runs several of China's key payment systems.

== Services ==
=== Payment systems ===
The CNCC operates the China National Advanced Payment System (CNAPS; Chinese: 中國現代化支付系統), a payment system with two main applications: the High-Value Payment System (HVPS; Chinese: 大额支付系统), which is a Real-Time Gross Settlement (RTGS) system comparable to Fedwire in the United States or T2 in the euro area, and the Bulk Electronic Payment System (BEPS; Chinese: 小额支付系统), a retail payment system.

==== High-Value Payment System ====
Since China's domestic RTGS system launched in June 2005 the HVPS has been described as "the backbone of the national payments system in China". In 2009 the HVPS processed 247 million transactions, amounting to 760 trillion renminbi (RMB) in turnover. By 2023 this had grown to 382 million transactions and turnover of 8,481 trillion RMB.

By the end of 2010 the HVPS had 1,729 direct participants and 100,510 indirect participants. Bank of China (Hong Kong) and Bank of China (Macau) were direct participants in HVPS and are its clearing agents in Hong Kong and Macau respectively. Although the number of direct participants had shrunk to 305 by the end of 2016, the count of indirect participants had grown significantly to 141,023.

==== Bulk Electronic Payment System ====
Launched in June 2006 the BEPS is a retail payment system embedded into the HVPS that is based on real-time netting and settlement at regular times during the day. In 2009 it processed 226 million transactions amounting to 11 trillion RMB in turnover. By 2023 this had grown to 4.6 billion transactions and turnover of RMB186 trillion.

By the end of 2010 BEPS had 1,730 direct participants and 100,510 indirect participants, almost exactly equivalent to HVPS, with which it shares the CNAPS platform.

==== Internet Banking Payment System ====
IBPS started operations in August 2010 and primarily handles instant payment transactions via the internet. It is a deferred net settlement (DNS) system, and by the end of July 2020 it had 218 direct participants and 175 proxy-access participants. In 2023, it processed 17 billion transactions, constituting about RMB301 trillion in turnover.

==== China Domestic Foreign Currency Payment System / China Foreign Exchange Payment System ====
The CDFCPS, sometimes abbreviated as FCPS, was established in 2008 by the People's Bank of China as a dedicated RTGS system to handle domestic transactions that are entirely in foreign currencies. As of the early 2010s it handled payments in Australian dollars (AUD), Canadian dollars (CAD), Swiss francs (CHF), euros (EUR), Pounds sterling (GBP), Hong Kong dollars (HKD), Japanese yen (JPY), and US dollars (USD). At this time, four commercial banks were designated as the system's proxy settlement banks, namely Bank of China, China Construction Bank, Industrial and Commercial Bank of China, and Shanghai Pudong Development Bank. The overwhelming majority of CDFCPS-settled transactions were in US dollars, and by the end of 2010 the CDFCPS had 31 participants. The English transcription of the original Chinese name was changed from CDFCPS to CFXPS in the early 2020s.

By contrast, domestic foreign-exchange (FX) transactions involving the RMB are not settled on CFXPS but can use the China Foreign Exchange Trade System (CFETS) as a clearing house, which in turn uses the HVPS to settle the RMB legs of the transactions. Thus, by the early 2010s the CFETS handled most domestic FX transactions. In 2023, CFXPS processed 5 million transactions amounting to US$2.6 trillion (RMB19 trillion) in turnover.

=== Other services ===
Other services operated by the CNCC include China's Check Imaging System (CIS); the Internet Banking Payment System (IBPS, Chinese: 网上支付跨行清算); and the China Foreign Exchange Payment System (CFXPS, Chinese: 境内外币支付系统). This last is another RTGS system that specializes in domestic transactions in foreign currencies, and was previously known in English as China Domestic Foreign Currency Payment System (CDFCPS or FCPS).

Launched in June 2007, the CNCC's Check Imaging System enables electronic exchange of check images and multilateral net settlement of the corresponding exchange instruments at the HVPS.

The CNCC also operates infrastructures for domestic payments, whether denominated in renminbi (RMB) or in foreign currencies. It thus complements other payment infrastructures that handle foreign exchange and offshore RMB payments, including China UnionPay, CFETS and CIPS, as well as those that support China's securities and derivatives markets, including CSDC, CCDC and the Shanghai Clearing House.

== See also ==
- Clearing House Automated Transfer System
