= CCP Global =

Global group of central counterparty clearing houses

CCP Global (CCPG) is a global body that brings together central counterparty clearing houses (CCPs) from the world's major jurisdictions.

== Overview ==
CCP Global was originally formed in 2001 as an informal group named CCP12 by twelve founding CCPs, and established a permanent executive committee in 2008. In 2015, it decide to evolve into a non-profit organization that opened in Shanghai in 2017. In 2022, CCP12 relocated to Amsterdam and, given expanded membership, rebranded as CCP Global in 2023.

== Membership ==
As of early 2025, the members of CCP Global were as follows.

- Argentina Clearing
- (Australia) Australian Securities Exchange (ASX)
- Bursa Malaysia
- (Brazil) Brasil Bolsa Balçao (B3)
- (United States) Cboe Clear
- (Colombia) Cámara de Riesgo Central de Contraparte (CRCC)
- (United States) CME Group
- China Securities Depository and Clearing Corporation (CSDC)
- Clearing Corporation of India Limited (CCIL)
- (Chile) ComDer Contraparte Central
- (United States) Depository Trust & Clearing Corporation (DTCC)
- (United Arab Emirates) Dubai Commodities Clearing Corporation (DCCC)
- (United Arab Emirates) Dubai Clear
- (Germany) Eurex
- Hong Kong Exchanges and Clearing (HKEX)
- (United States) Intercontinental Exchange (ICE)
- Japan Exchange (JPX)
- (South Africa) Johannesburg Stock Exchange (JSE)
- (Hungary) KELER CCP
- (Poland) KDPW_CCP
- (Indonesia) IDClear
- Korea Exchange (KRX)
- (United Kingdom) London Stock Exchange Group (LSEG)
- (India) Multi Commodity Exchange Clearing Corporation Limited (MCXCCL)
- (United States) MIAX Futures
- (United States) Nasdaq
- (Saudi Arabia) Muqassa
- (India) NSE Clearing
- (New Zealand) NZX Clearing
- (United States) Options Clearing Corporation (OCC)
- (China) Shanghai Clearing House (SHCH)
- (Singapore) SGX Group
- (Taiwan) Taipei Exchange
- (Taiwan) Taipei Futures Exchange (TAIFEX)
- (Turkey) Takasbank
- Taiwan Stock Exchange (TWSE)
- Thailand Clearing House (TCH)
- (Canada) TMX Group

== See also ==
- World Forum of Central Securities Depositories
- World Federation of Exchanges
- Global Financial Markets Association
- Financial infrastructure
