= Financial infrastructure =

Financial infrastructure may refer to:

- financial market infrastructure, firms that provide critical services such as payment, trading platforms, clearing and settlement;
- a synonym for financial sector development, particularly in the context of early modern economies and contemporary developing countries;
- in relation to terrorism financing, the financial firms and processes that support such activity.

== See also ==
- Committee on Payments and Market Infrastructures
