= Financial market infrastructure =

Critical component of the financial system

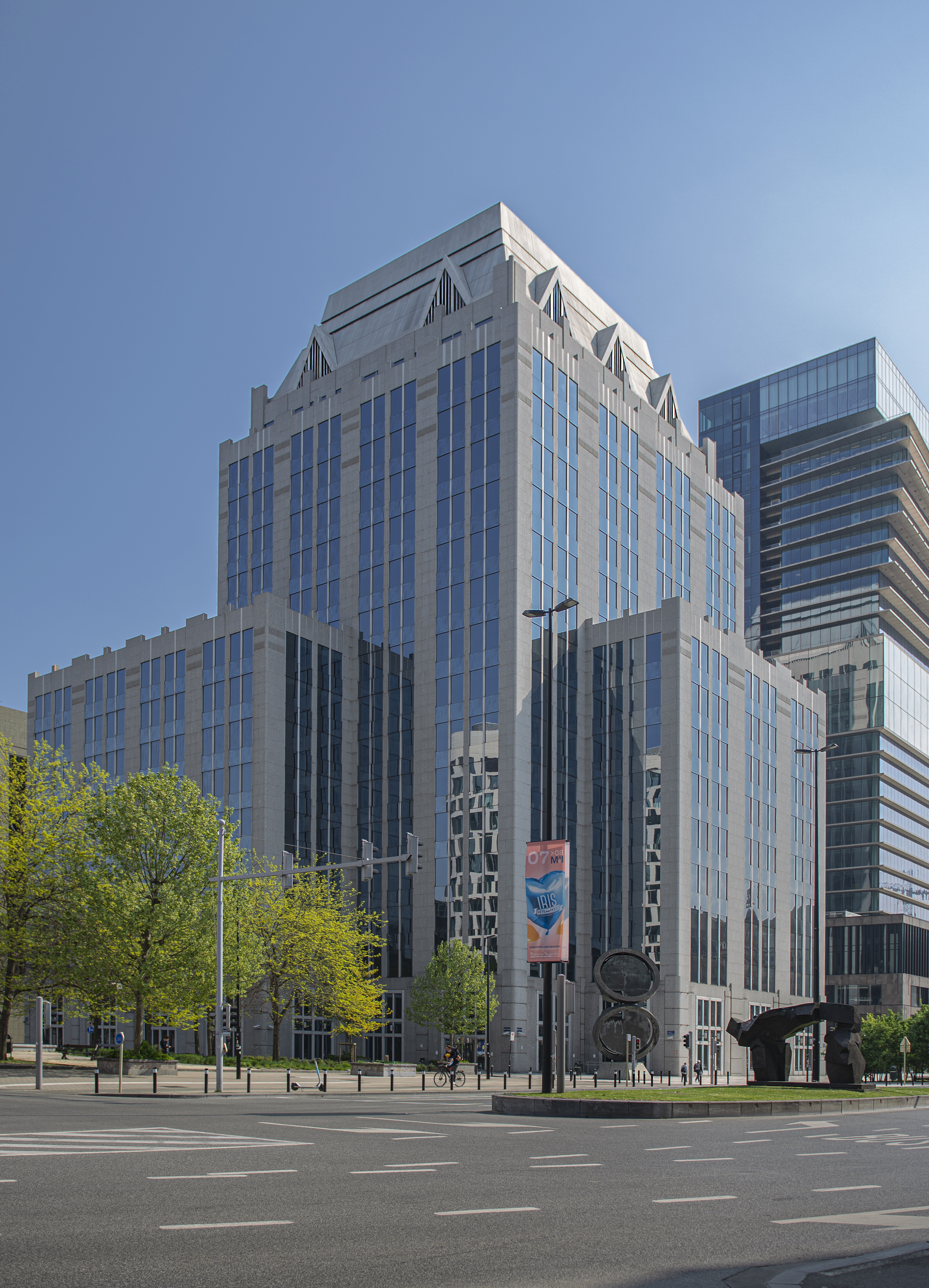
Brussels head office of Euroclear, a major international financial market infrastructure

Financial market infrastructure refers to systems and entities involved in clearing, settlement, and the recording of payments, securities, derivatives, and other financial transactions. Depending on context, financial market infrastructure may refer to the category in general, or to individual companies or entities (thus also used in plural: financial market infrastructures).

== Examples ==
Examples of financial market infrastructure firms include payment systems, securities settlement systems, central counterparties, central securities depositories, and trade repositories.

Some financial infrastructures have a global reach, such as financial messaging service SWIFT, foreign-exchange settlement service provider CLS Group, and international central securities depositories Euroclear Bank and Clearstream Banking SA.

Other major commercial financial infrastructure firms include:

- the Depository Trust & Clearing Corporation (DTCC), which operates the Depository Trust Company (DTC), the Fixed Income Clearing Corporation (FICC), the National Securities Clearing Corporation (NSCC) in the United States as well as a global derivatives trade repository service
- The Clearing House Payments Company (also known as PayCo), which operates the Clearing House Interbank Payments System (CHIPS) in the U.S.
- CME Clearing, ICE Clear Credit, and the Options Clearing Corporation, involved in derivatives clearing in the U.S.
- Eurex Clearing in Germany, SIX SIS in Switzerland, London Clearing House in the euro area and the United Kingdom
- China Central Depository & Clearing (ChinaBond), China Securities Depository and Clearing Corporation (ChinaClear), the Shanghai Clearing House, and Cross-Border Interbank Payment System (CIPS) in China

Financial trading venues such as stock exchanges, futures exchanges, commodities exchanges and electronic trading platforms, are not always considered financial market infrastructures where they are subject to competition, but are included in the definition of financial market infrastructures in certain jurisdictions such as Switzerland. Many exchanges are subsidiaries of financial infrastructure groups such as CME Group, Deutsche Börse, Euronext, Hong Kong Exchanges and Clearing, Intercontinental Exchange, Japan Exchange Group, London Stock Exchange Group, Nasdaq, Inc., Singapore Exchange, and SIX Swiss Exchange.

Some financial infrastructures, including many payment systems, are directly operated by central banks. These include a number of Real-time gross settlement (RTGS) systems such as the High-Value Payment System in China, T2 in the euro area, CHAPS in the United Kingdom, and Fedwire in the U.S. Other central bank-operated infrastructures include the China Foreign Exchange Trade System (CFETS) in China, or TARGET2-Securities in the euro area and beyond.

== Regulation and monitoring ==
Financial market infrastructures, many of which are natural monopolies, are typically of critical systemic importance and thus subject to intrusive regulation and monitoring.

At the global level, the applicable standards are the Principles for Financial Market Infrastructures (PFMI), first issued in April 2012 jointly by the Committee on Payments and Settlement Systems (CPSS, renamed in 2014 as Committee on Payments and Market Infrastructures - CPMI) and the International Organization of Securities Commissions (IOSCO). These brought together standards that had previously been issued separately for systemically important payment systems (CPSS, January 2001), securities settlement systems (CPSS & IOSCO, November 2001), and central counterparties (CPSS & IOSCO, November 2004).

The related semantics sometimes distinguishes between supervision, typically by prudential authorities and securities commissions, and oversight by central banks, even though in practice that distinction has eroded over the years. For example, international cooperative oversight frameworks exist for SWIFT (led by the National Bank of Belgium) and CLS (led by the U.S. Federal Reserve). The Eurosystem oversight framework, led by the European Central Bank, associates National Central Banks to the oversight of TARGET Services, EURO1 and STEP2-T.

== See also ==
- Market microstructure
- Financial Market Infrastructure Act in Switzerland
- Systemically important financial market utility, a designation for systemic financial infrastructures in the United States
- Systemically important payment systems, a category defined by the Committee on Payment and Settlement Systems in the early 2000s
