= Taipei Exchange =

Foundation which serves the over-the-counter (OTC) market and bond trading of Taiwan

- 財團法人中華民國證券櫃檯買賣中心
- Type: Stock exchange
- Location: Taipei, Taiwan
- Founded: November 1, 1994
- Website: www.tpex.org.tw

Taipei Exchange
- Traditional Chinese: 證券櫃檯買賣中心
Transcriptions
Standard Mandarin
- Hanyu Pinyin: Zhèngquàn Guìtái Mǎimài Zhōngxīn
- Wade–Giles: Chêng⁴-ch′üan⁴ Kui⁴-t′ai² Mai³-mai⁴ Chung¹-hsin¹
Hakka
- Pha̍k-fa-sṳ: Chṳn-khién Khui-thòi Mâi-mai Chûng-sîm
Southern Min
- Hokkien POJ: Chèng-kǹg Kūi-tâi Bé-bē Tiong-sim
- Tâi-lô: Tsìng-kǹg Kūi-tâi Bé-bē Tiong-sim

Alternative Chinese name
- Traditional Chinese: 櫃買中心
Transcriptions
Standard Mandarin
- Hanyu Pinyin: Guìmǎizhōngxīn
- Wade–Giles: Kui⁴-mai³-chung¹-hsin¹
Hakka
- Pha̍k-fa-sṳ: Khui-mâi-chûng-sîm
Southern Min
- Hokkien POJ: Kūi-bé-tiong-sim
- Tâi-lô: Kūi-bé-tiong-sim

Taipei Exchange (Chinese: 證券櫃檯買賣中心; Pe̍h-ōe-jī: Chèng-kǹg Kūi-tâi Bé-bē Tiong-sim), formerly the GreTai Securities Market (GTSM), is a non-profit foundation set up to manage over-the-counter (OTC) market and bond trading in Taiwan. It was founded on 1 November 1994. The initial fund of the foundation was contributed by the Taiwan Stock Exchange, Taiwan Securities Association, and Taiwan Depository & Clearing. Its headquarters is in the Zhongzheng District of Taipei City. In February 2015, the Gre Tai Securities Market changed its name to Taipei Exchange.

The exchange has normal trading sessions from 9 am to 2 pm and post-market sessions from 2 pm to 2.30 pm on all days of the week except Saturdays, Sundays and holidays declared by the Exchange in advance.

== See also ==
- List of East Asian stock exchanges
- List of stock exchanges
- CCP Global
