= Financial Market Infrastructure Act =

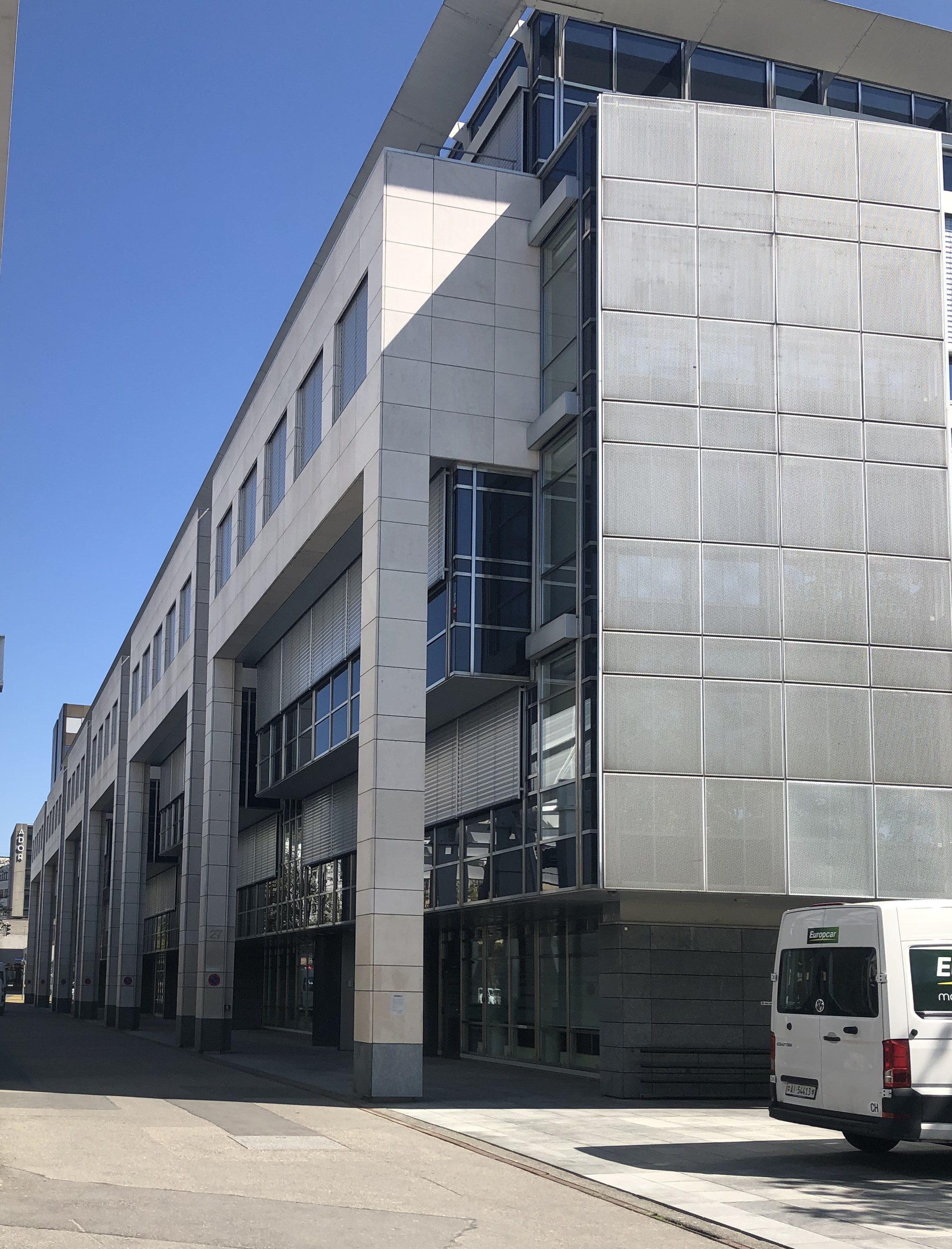
- FINMA offices in Bern.

Federal Assembly of Switzerland
- Passed: June 19, 2015
- Enacted: January 1, 2016
- Status: Current legislation

The Financial Market Infrastructure Act (FMIA), original title Finanzmarktinfrastrukturgesetz (FinfraG) is a body of Swiss legislation for the regulation of financial market infrastructures and in particular derivatives. It was originally adopted by the Swiss Federal Assembly on June 19, 2015 and came into force on January 1, 2016.

The objective of the legislation is to reduce systemic counterparty and operational risk, and help prevent future financial system collapses. FMIA is intended as the Swiss equivalent to the regulatory packages in the U.S. and the European Union, such as Dodd–Frank and EMIR / MiFID, respectively.

The FMIA regulations include requirements for reporting of derivative contracts and implementation of risk management standards. It also established common rules for central counterparties and trade repositories. The implementation of FMIA is overseen by FINMA.

== Sources ==
- FMIA Legal Act, translation of Bundesgesetz über die Finanzmarktinfrastrukturen und das Marktverhalten im Effekten- und Derivatehandel (Finanzmarktinfrastrukturgesetz, FinfraG). In: Bundesblatt, Vol. 2015, No. 25 of 30 June 2015, pg. 4931–4983.
- FMIA Ordinance, Ordinance on Financial Market Infrastructures and Market Conduct in Securities and Derivatives Trading, translation of Verordnung über die Finanzmarktinfrastrukturen und das Marktverhalten im Effekten- und Derivatehandel (Finanzmarktinfrastrukturverordnung, FinfraV). In: Bundesblatt, Vol. 2015, pg. 5413–5508. (SR 958.11)
- European Trade Repository - FinfraG
