= Benoit Crutzen =

Belgian economist

Benoît S. Y. Crutzen (born October 2, 1972) is a Belgian economist who currently holds the position of Assistant Professor of the Department of Economics at the Erasmus University Rotterdam (EUR). His research interest focuses on political economy.

== Education ==
Benoît Crutzen received a first degree in economics from Bocconi University in Milan in 1995 and a MPhil from Oxford University in 1998. Later, he went on to acquire a DEA in statistics with a focus on economics from the Free University of Brussels in 2001 as well as a PhD in 2004.

== Professional Activity ==
After earning and MPhil in Economics from Oxford University in 1998, Crutzen moved to the Free University of Brussels to complete a PhD. He worked there as a teaching assistant from 2000 to 2005, teaching introductory economics and macroeconomics at an undergraduate as well as econometrics at both undergraduate and graduate level. From 2005 onwards, Crutzen has taught as an assistant professor at both the undergraduate and graduate level at Erasmus University, Rotterdam, including courses in microeconomics, game theory and financial development. In parallel, he worked in 2008/2009 at the University of Namur as visiting scholar, teaching a course about economics and politics, as well as at the Free University of Brussels in 2009/2010 where he taught about public finance, microeconomics and European political economy. As a teacher, while in his prime, Crutzen won the award of Top Lecturer of the Year at the Erasmus School of Economics in 2008/2009, 2009/2010 and 2013/14. As a researcher, Crutzen has been published (with Otto Swank and Bauke Visser) in the Journal of Economics and Management Strategy, (with Micael Castanheira and Nicolas Sahuguet) in the Journal of Law, Economics & Organization and with Nicolas Sahuguet in the Journal of Economic Theory, among others. His main research interest is political economy, with a focus on intra-party organizational aspects.

== Languages ==
He is a native speaker of both French and Italian, fluent in English and speaks Dutch on an intermediate level.

== Sources ==
- Benoît Crutzen's CV from the Erasmus School of Economics Website
