= Eurex =

International exchange

Eurex Exchange
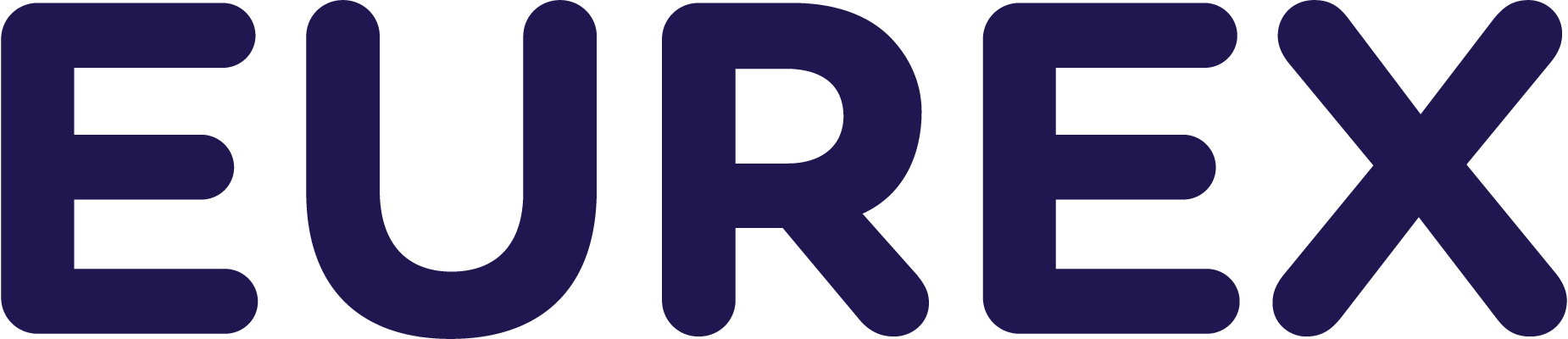
- Type: Derivatives exchange
- Location: Eschborn, near Frankfurt am Main, Germany
- Founded: 1998; 28 years ago
- Owner: Deutsche Börse AG
- Key people: Members of the Board: Robbert Booij (CEO), Melanie Dannheimer, Quinten Koekenbier, Jonas Ullmann
- No. of listings: About 2,200 Futures and options in equity, equity index, interest rate, volatility, dividend, FX, ETFs
- Volume: 1.5 bn contracts ADV 5.9 mn contracts
- Website: www.eurex.com

Eurex Exchange is a German derivatives exchange which primarily offers trading in European based derivatives. The products traded on this exchange vary from German and Swiss debt instruments to European stocks and various stock indexes. All transactions executed on Eurex Exchange are cleared through Eurex Clearing, which functions as a central counterparty (CCP) for multi-asset class clearing of the above-mentioned exchange-traded product range as well as over-the-counter traded products.

As of 2015, in the Futures Industry Association’s annual survey, Eurex Exchange was ranked as the world's third-largest derivatives exchange by contract volume. The Exchange is headquartered in Eschborn, Germany, near Frankfurt am Main, and it is operated by Eurex Frankfurt AG and Eurex Zürich AG, which are public companies wholly owned by the German stock exchange operator Deutsche Börse AG.

== History ==
In the 1990s, Europe went through a power shift in its financial sector. London (LIFFE, London Financial Futures Exchange) began to lose dominance in trading German government bonds futures (The Bund) to the Frankfurt-based Deutsche Terminbörse (DTB). This event has come to be known as the ‘Battle of the Bund’.

The DTB was one of the world's first electronic exchanges, and by 1997 had distributed its screens across Europe and into the United States. As the DTB was in the midst of a battle to wrench liquidity in the Bund contract away from its chief cross-continental rival, the open outcry operated LIFFE, it began the merger proceedings with SOFFEX (the Swiss Options and Financial Futures Exchange). The shift started gradually but then followed a “tipping point” dynamic that began in early 1998.

All of these dynamic changes led in 1998 to the creation of Eurex. Its creation took almost a decade of close cooperation between the DTB and SOFFEX and their parent companies, Deutsche Börse AG and SIX Swiss Exchange to be completed. Eurex was jointly operated by Deutsche Börse and the SIX Swiss Exchange with the German group holding 50 percent of the voting rights and 85 percent of the share capital. This joint leadership lasted until January 2012, when Deutsche Börse acquired the remaining shares in Eurex Zurich AG from SIX Group AG, making Deutsche Börse the sole owner of the pan-European derivatives exchange.

Eurex has nine worldwide representative offices.

== Trading technology ==
The open outcry style of trading was still the norm in the US and the UK in 1998 when Eurex launched. Eurex Exchange was one of the first to offer a fully electronic trading platform as opposed to the traditional forms, such as open outcry or pit trading, available at the time. That means buyers and sellers transacted from remote locations and were brought together through an electronic trading platform and network.

A new platform was launched in 2013 and was known as the T7 trading architecture. T7 was originally developed by Deutsche Börse Group and it advanced electronic derivatives trading. As of 2016, this trading platform connected more than 7,700 traders in over 35 countries, trading more than 7.0 million contracts daily.

== See also ==
- CCP Global
- List of banks in the euro area
- List of banks in Germany
