= China Banknote Printing and Minting Corporation =

Chinese security printer

- Type: State owned company
- Website: www.cbpm.cn/en/

China Banknote Printing and Minting Corporation (CBPMC; Chinese: 中國印鈔造幣集團有限公司; pinyin: Zhōngguó Yìnchāo Zàobì Jítuán Yǒuxiàngōngsī) is a state-owned corporation which carries out the minting of all renminbi coins and printing of renminbi banknotes for the People's Republic of China.

== Overview ==
CBPMC is a public-sector agency within the People's Bank of China. It uses a network of printing and engraving and minting facilities around the country to produce banknotes and coins for subsequent distribution. Banknote printing facilities are located in Beijing, Shanghai, Chengdu, Xi'an, Shijiazhuang, and Nanchang.

The state-owned company, headquartered in Beijing's Xicheng District is the world's largest money printer by volume. With more than 18,000 employees, it runs more than 10 highly secure facilities for the production of banknotes and coins. Mints are located in Shanghai, Shenyang, Shenzhen, and Nanjing. The Shanghai Mint is the oldest and most important mint in China, having been founded in 1920 during the Beiyang era of the Republic of China. Shanghai, Shenyang, and Shenzhen primarily mint fiat coins for circulation. Nanjing primarily prints fiat banknotes, and also does coining of small quantities of non-fiat coins for coin collectors. High grade paper for the banknotes is produced at two facilities in Baoding and Kunshan. The Baoding facility is the largest facility in the world dedicated to developing banknote material

In addition, the People's Bank of China has its own printing technology research division which research new techniques for creating banknotes and making counterfeiting more difficult.

The CBPMC bases its production of currency on the macroeconomic planning of the People's Bank of China.

CBPMC reportedly produces currency for a number of other countries, including Thailand, Bangladesh, Sri Lanka, Malaysia and Brazil.

== See also ==
- China National Clearing Center
