= Clearing House Automated Transfer System =

Electronic fund transfer system

The Clearing House Automated Transfer System (CHATS) is a real-time gross settlement (RTGS) system for the transfer of funds in Hong Kong. It is operated by Hong Kong Interbank Clearing Limited (HKICL), a limited-liability private company jointly owned by the Hong Kong Monetary Authority (HKMA) and the Hong Kong Association of Banks. Transactions in four currency denominations may be settled using CHATS: Hong Kong dollar, renminbi, euro, and US dollar. In 2005, the value of Hong Kong dollar CHATS transactions averaged HK$467 billion per day, which amounted to a third of Hong Kong's annual Gross Domestic Product (GDP); the total value of transactions that year was 84 times the GDP of Hong Kong. CHATS has been referred by authors at the Bank for International Settlements to as "the poster child of multicurrency offshore systems".

== History ==
Prior to the launch of CHATS as a RTGS system, interbank settlements in Hong Kong relied on a multi-tier system which settled on a daily net basis. About 170 banks settled with ten clearing banks. These ten banks, in turn, settled with Hongkong Bank, which then settled with the HKMA on a one-to-one basis. Hongkong Bank acted as the clearing house under this system, settling payments across its books on a net basis on the day following the transactions. The HKMA decided that this did not meet international standards as set by G10's Committee on Payment and Settlement Systems; following a six-month feasibility study, in June 1994, it decided to develop CHATS as an RTGS system.

After two years of development, CHATS for Hong Kong dollars was launched on 9 December 1996. CHATS for US dollars, Euros and Renmenbi were launched on 21 August 2000, 28 April 2003 and 18 June 2007 respectively. In July 2007, the Regional CHATS Payment Services was also launched to link all participants in the HKD, USD and EUR CHATS for transactions involving currency exchange.

== Features ==
CHATS, like other RTGS systems, settles payment transactions on a "real time" and "gross" basis—payments are not subjected to any waiting period and each transaction is settled in a one-to-one manner such that it is not bunched with other transactions. It is a single-tier system where participants settle with one central clearing house. Payments are final, irrevocable, and settled immediately if the participant's settlement account with the clearing house has sufficient funds. Daylight overdraft is not offered in CHATS; payments that cannot be settled due to insufficient funds are queued. Banks are able to alter, cancel, and re-sequence payments in their queues.

Banks can obtain interest-free intraday liquidity through repurchase agreements (repos). This prevents banks from having to maintain large balances in their settlement accounts, which accrue no interest, to cover their payments. Intraday repos that are not reversed at the end of the business day are carried into overnight borrowing.

To access RTGS system functions, banks must connect to the SWIFT network to initiate/receive payment instructions, and access eMBT provided by HKICL for performing administrative functions to respective payment instructions.

== Hong Kong dollar CHATS ==
The HKMA, which is Hong Kong's central banking institution, acts as the clearing house for Hong Kong dollar (HKD) CHATS. All licensed banks in Hong Kong maintain HKD settlement accounts with the HKMA, and as of June 2000, restricted license banks "with a clear business need" may also open settlement accounts with the HKMA. The volume of transactions in HKD CHATS in 2007, in raw number of transactions, totaled at 5,499,494. The total value of all transactions conducted in the same year was about HK$217 trillion. As of 28 December 2015, there are 156 participating banks with HKD CHATS.

== US dollar CHATS ==
Unlike HKD CHATS, the clearing house for US dollar (USD) CHATS is a commercial bank, Hongkong and Shanghai Banking Corporation (HSBC). In addition to obtaining intraday repos for payment settlement, participating banks may also obtain intraday liquidity via an overdraft facility provided by HSBC. Banks in Hong Kong are not required to participate in USD CHATS; they may choose to join as direct participants or indirect participants. Direct participants maintain USD settlement accounts with HSBC for payment transactions in CHATS. Indirect participants must conduct their payment transactions through direct participants. Additionally, a membership category called Indirect CHATS Users exists where its banks also conduct their payment transactions through direct participants. The volume of transactions in USD CHATS in 2007, in raw number of transactions, totaled at 2,121,058. The total value of all transactions conducted in the same year was about US$2,127 billion. As of 28 December 2015, USD CHATS has 100 direct participant member banks, 24 indirect participant member banks, 87 Indirect CHATS User member banks, and eight Third Party User member banks.

== Euro CHATS ==
Euro CHATS is structured similarly to USD CHATS. Its clearing house is also a commercial bank, Standard Chartered Hong Kong. Participating banks may obtain intraday liquidity via an overdraft facility provided by Standard Chartered Bank. Like USD CHATS, banks in Hong Kong are not required to participate in Euro CHATS. Euro CHATS has two categories of membership, Direct Participants and Indirect CHATS Users; they function in the same manner as the categories in USD CHATS. The volume of transactions in Euro CHATS in 2007, in raw number of transactions, totaled at 18,169. The total value of all transactions conducted in the same year was about €280 billion. As of 28 December 2015, Euro CHATS has 37 Direct Participant member banks and 18 Indirect CHATS User member banks.

== Renminbi CHATS ==
CHATS uses Bank of China (Hong Kong) as its clearing house for settling renminbi payments. Bank of China has a settlement account on the China National Advanced Payment System (CNAPS), allowing renminbi CHATS to effectively work as an extension of the Chinese system.

== See also ==
- Faster Payment System, a newer, cheaper and round-the-clock RTGS system facing to general public in Hong Kong, which also supports fund transfers from, to or between electronic payment and digital wallet operators.
- Fedwire (US)
- Clearing House Interbank Payments System (US)
- Clearing House Automated Payments System (UK)
- TARGET Services (EU)
- Indian Settlement Systems
- Society for Worldwide Interbank Financial Telecommunication
