= Shanghai Clearing House =

Financial infrastructure in China

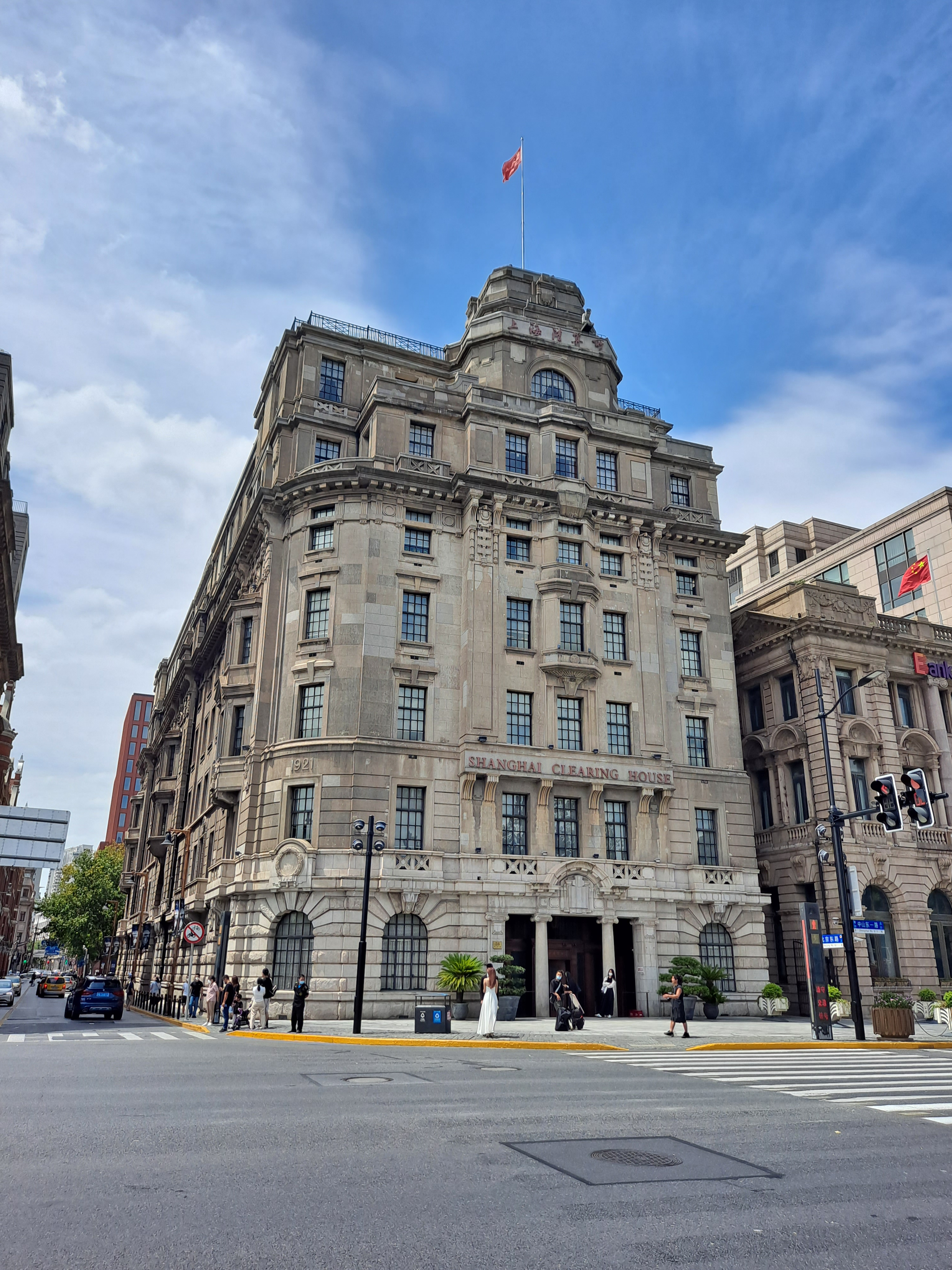
Head office of the Shanghai Clearing House on the Bund, originally built in 1920 for Britain's Glen Line

The Shanghai Clearing House (SHCH, Chinese: 上海清算所), formally the Inter-bank Market Clearing House Co., Ltd. (Chinese: 銀行間市場清算所股份有限公司簡稱上海清算所), is a significant central counterparty and central securities depository in China, established in 2009 in Shanghai.

== Overview ==
The Shanghai Clearing House was established on 28 November 2009 and was recognized as a Qualified Central Counterparty by the People's Bank of China. Its founding shareholders were China Foreign Exchange Trade System (46.7 percent), China Central Depository & Clearing (33.3 percent), China Banknote Printing and Minting Corporation (10 percent), and China Gold Coin Inc. (10 percent).

It provides services in central counterparty clearing, registration and custody, risk management and valuation, statistical information, and financial knowledge dissemination. In 2018, the total clearing volume on the Shanghai Clearing House reached 4.6 million, 31 percent up on the previous year, for an amount of RMB 349.5 trillion, up 32 percent.

In the European Union, the Shanghai Clearing House was recognized as a third-country central counterparties by the European Securities and Markets Authority on 3 October 2022. In the United States, it is authorized to clear swaps for the proprietary accounts of its clearing members that are U.S. persons or affiliates of U.S. persons, by exemption granted by the Commodity Futures Trading Commission. As such, it is not registered as a derivatives clearing organization (DCO).

The Shanghai Clearing House is a member of the CCP Global, the global association of clearing houses, which was itself registered in Shanghai in 2015 and opened an office there in 2017.

== See also ==
- China Central Depository & Clearing (CCDC)
- China Securities Depository and Clearing Corporation (CSDC)
- China Foreign Exchange Trade System (CFETS)
- Cross-Border Interbank Payment System (CIPS)
- Asia-Pacific Central Securities Depository Group
- CCP Global
