= Renminbi currency value =

Value of the currency of China

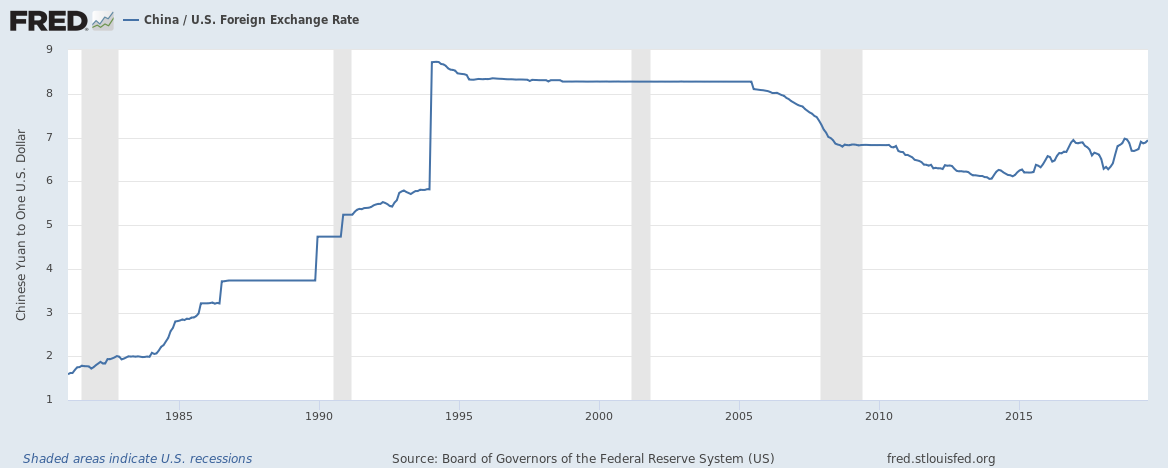
Renminbi (yuan) for each dollar (USD) since 1981. Higher values mean a weaker renminbi

Renminbi currency value is a debate affecting the Chinese currency unit, the renminbi (Chinese: 人民币 Code:CNY). The renminbi is classified as a managed floating exchange rate currency "with reference to a basket of currencies", which has drawn attention from nations which have freely floated currencies and has become a source of trade friction with Western nations.

== Background ==
The renminbi was introduced in October 1949 after the Communists took power in mainland China and established the People's Republic of China. Since the reform and opening up of 1978, China has become the world's biggest exporter, second largest economy and biggest manufacturer in the world.

For most of its early history, the renminbi was pegged to the U.S. dollar at ¥2.46 per USD. During the 1970s it was revalued, until it reached ¥1.50 per USD in 1980.

Its value gradually declined as China embarked on a new economic course during Deng Xiaoping's leadership and transformed into a more market-based capitalistic economy.

Since 2005, the Chinese government has overturned its previous policy of pegging the Renminbi to the US dollar. The renminbi now floats within a small margin compared to a basket of currencies selected by the Chinese government. This is seen as a move to a more fully free-market floating of the Renminbi. The Renminbi has appreciated 22 percent since the mechanism reform in 2005 of the Yuan exchange rate. However, during the onset of the 2008 financial crisis, the renminbi was unofficially repegged to the US dollar. It was again depegged from the dollar in June 2010.

After 2010, the exchange rate floated in line with fundamentals, staying mostly between 6 and 7 CNY per USD. In 2018, the renminbi lost value as China's exports were targeted by USA tariffs and markets had doubts about the strength of the economy. Such a depreciation is typical of a country whose exports are at risk, as shown by the drop of the pound after Brexit, and in July 2019 the IMF found the yuan to be correctly valued, while the dollar was overvalued. In August 2019, the People's Bank of China (PBOC) let the renminbi fall over 2% in three days to the lowest point since 2008 as it was hit by strong sales after threats of further USA tariffs.

== International consequences ==
An undervalued currency causes serious problems and raises international criticism. Prominent economists including World Trade Organization (WTO) Director-General Pascal Lamy, U.S. Federal Reserve Chairman Ben Bernanke, Nobel Laureate Paul Krugman, Director of the Peterson Institute for International Economics Fred Bergsten, and Cornell University Professor Eswar Prasad have repeatedly stated that China's currency is undervalued.

In 2007, proposed US legislation estimated undervaluation to be between 15% and 40%, and the Peterson Institute study said in 2010 that the yuan was 20 percent undervalued versus the dollar.

1. As a member of the WTO and IMF, China's undervalued renminbi would violate Article XV(4) of the General Agreement on Tariffs and Trade Article 1, and 3 of the WTO Agreement on Subsidies and Countervailing Measures, and Article IV Section 1 of the IMF that prohibiting countries from currency manipulation. However, the USA Treasury in 2018 cleared China from the accusation of currency manipulation.
2. The trade dispute with the U.S. would be worsened by an undervalued renminbi.
3. An undervalued renminbi could cause inflation. In an effort to hold the value of the yuan comparatively low, the government has to buy foreign currencies through trade surpluses and investment. China's foreign reserves, already the world's biggest, soared to $2.8 trillion at the end of 2010. In order to buy foreign currencies, the government has to print the RMB "at a furious pace" and therefore incur inflation. However, between 2012 and 2019, China's inflation has been reported to be persistently low, around 2%.
4. An undervalued renminbi would contribute to very large portfolio foreign capital inflows, motivated by expectations of quick appreciation, adding pressure for the currency to rise.
5. An undervalued renminbi would undermine domestic consumers' purchasing power when it comes to goods from outside the country. An undervalued currency makes foreign goods more expensive in terms of yuan.

== Chinese domestic discourse ==
Chinese economic reforms in the late 1970s propelled the Chinese economy from being a closed centrally planned economy to one open to foreign investments and capital, oriented to manufacturing of electrical goods, textile, toys and exports. These reforms have allowed China to become a creditor country in relations to current accounts and the largest in terms of foreign reserves.

China maintains that the value of the renminbi is market-driven. China says that its population receives high savings from the structure of the economy, and that gradual increase in domestic consumption is important for its own growth. While the Chinese have argued that their exchange rate is purely a domestic policy matter, economists have begun to suggest that Chinese policy will soon shift to accelerate appreciation of the Yuan in order to reduce domestic inflation and to increase the wealth of Chinese citizens.

Others in China view this dispute as an attempt to ring in China's economic development as part of a strategy for economic imperialism of the industrialized world led by the United States. They likened it to the unequal treaties signed after the Boxer Rebellion and the First and Second Opium Wars.
