= Faster Payment System =

Faster Payment System may refer to:

- Faster Payment System (Hong Kong)
- Faster Payment System (Russia)
- Faster Payment System (United Kingdom)
