= Financial sector development =

Financial sector development in developing countries and emerging markets is part of the private sector development strategy to stimulate economic growth and reduce poverty. The Financial sector is the set of institutions, instruments, and markets. It also includes the legal and regulatory framework that permit transactions to be made through the extension of credit. Fundamentally, financial sector development concerns overcoming “costs” incurred in the financial system. This process of reducing costs of acquiring information, enforcing contracts, and executing transactions results in the emergence of financial contracts, intermediaries, and markets. Different types and combinations of information, transaction, and enforcement costs in conjunction with different regulatory, legal and tax systems have motivated distinct forms of contracts, intermediaries and markets across countries in different times.

The five key functions of a financial system in a country are: (i) information production ex ante about possible investments and capital allocation; (ii) monitoring investments and the exercise of corporate governance after providing financing; (iii) facilitation of the trading, diversification, and management of risk; (iv) mobilization and pooling of savings; and (v) promoting the exchange of goods and services.

Financial sector development takes place when financial instruments, markets, and intermediaries collaborate to reduce the costs of information, enforcement and transactions. An efficient financial sector is a powerful engine behind economic growth. It generates local savings, which in turn lead to productive investments in local business. Furthermore, effective banks can channel international streams of private remittances. The financial sector therefore provides the rudiments for income-growth and job creation.

== Importance of financial sector development ==
There are ample evidence suggesting that financial sector development plays a significant role in economic development. It promotes economic growth through capital accumulation and technological advancement by boosting savings rate, delivering information about investment, optimizing the allocation of capital, mobilizing and pooling savings, and facilitating and encouraging foreign capital inflows. A meta-analysis of 67 empirical studies finds that financial development is robustly associated with economic growth.

Countries with better-developed financial systems tend to enjoy a sustained period of growth, and studies confirm the causal link between the two: financial development is not simply a result of economic growth; it is also the driver for growth.

Additionally, it reduces poverty and inequality by enabling and broadening access for the poor and vulnerable groups, facilitating risk management by reducing their vulnerability to shocks, and raising investment and productivity that generates higher income.

Financial sector development also assists the growth of small and medium-sized enterprises (SMEs) by giving them with access to finance. SMEs are typically labor-intensive and create more jobs than large firms, which contributes significantly to economic development in emerging economies.

Additionally, financial sector development also entails establishing robust financial policies and regulatory framework. The absence of adequate financial sector policies could have disastrous outcomes, as illustrated by the 2008 financial crisis. Financial sector development has heavy implication on economic development‐‐both when it functions and malfunctions.

The crisis has challenged conventional thinking in financial sector policies and sparked debate on how best to achieve sustainable development. To effectively reassess and re-implement financial policies, publications such as Global Financial Development Report (GFDR) by the World Bank and Global Financial Stability Report (GFSR) by the IMF can play an important role.

The Global Financial Development Report, a new initiative by the World Bank, highlights issues that have come to the forefront after the crisis and presents policy recommendation to strengthen systems and avoid similar crisis in the future. By gathering data and knowledge on financial development around the world, the GFDR report aims to put into spotlight issues of financial development and hopes to present analysis and expert views on current policy issues.

In Malaysia, the Asian Institute of Finance was established by Bank Negara Malaysia and Securities Commission Malaysia to develop human capital in the financial services industry.

== Theories of financial sector development ==
Acemoglu, Johnson and Robinson emphasize the importance of the distribution of political power in shaping the differing paths of financial sector development in the United States and Mexico in the 19th and early 20th century. They note that in the United States banking and financial services grew rapidly because American politicians did not have the power to create monopolies in the banking sector that they could appropriate rents from. The federal nature of the US political system meant that states ended up competing with each other to attract inward investment. This in turn, made the restriction of competition in the banking sector untenable. In Mexico, on the other hand, power was centralized in the hands of Porfirio Díaz, the dictator who came to power in 1910. Suffrage was highly restricted and there were no competing federal states which meant that political power was not widely spread. As a result, "the central government granted monopoly rights to banks" which enabled them to "raise revenue and redistribute rents to political supporters." Only businesses with close personal connections to the banks and the politicians were able to gain access to finance which hindered the development of arms length finance.

Rajan and Zingales focus on the power of interest groups to explain cross-sectional and time-series variation in financial sector development. They argue that incumbents in industry and the financial sector have an incentive to oppose the availability of arms-length finance and greater competition in the financial sector because that would lower their market share and profit margins. Cross border capital flows limit the government's ability to direct credit and give out subsidies to these firms is restricted. The arrival of new foreign firms will cause banks to push for improved disclosure standards and contract enforcement because they would not have personal connections with foreign firms. Incumbent firms will be unable to rely on connections in the banking sector to provide them with loans and will therefore push for more competition and lower barriers to entry in the financial sector so their access to finance improves. In this model, increased trade and capital flows are an exogenous shock that can change the incentives of the economic elite. They now have an incentive to level the playing field and ensure that everyone plays by the same set of rules.

== Measurement of financial development ==
A good measurement of financial development is crucial in evaluating the progress of financial sector development and understanding the corresponding impact on economic growth and poverty reduction.

However, in practice, it is difficult to measure financial development given the complexity and dimensions it encompasses. Empirical work done so far is usually based on standard quantitative indicators available for a longer time period for a broad range of countries. For instance, ratio of financial institutions’ assets to GDP, ratio of liquid liabilities to GDP, and ratio of deposits to GDP.

However, since the financial sector of a country comprises a variety of financial institutions, markets and products, these measures only serve as a rough estimate and do not fully capture all aspects of financial development.

The World Bank's Global Financial Development Database (GFDD) developed a comprehensive yet relatively simple conceptual 4x2 framework to measure financial development worldwide. This framework identifies four sets of proxy variables characterizing a well-functioning financial system: financial depth, access, efficiency, and stability. These four dimensions are then broken down for two major components in the financial sector, namely the financial institutions and financial markets:

| | Financial institutions | Financial markets |
|---|---|---|
| Depth | Private Sector Credit to GDP; Financial Institutions’ asset to GDP; M2 to GDP; Deposits to GDP; Gross value added of the financial sector to GDP | Stock market capitalization and outstanding domestic private debt securities to GDP; Private Debt securities to GDP; Public Debt Securities to GDP; International Debt Securities to GDP; Stock Market Capitalization to GDP; Stocks traded to GDP |
| Access | Accounts per thousand adults (commercial banks); Branches per 100,000 adults (commercial banks); % of people with a bank account (from user survey); % of firms with line of credit (all firms); % of firms with line of credit (small firms) | Percent of market capitalization outside of top 10 largest companies; Percent of value traded outside of top 10 traded companies; Government bond yields (3 month and 10 years); Ratio of domestic to total debt securities; Ratio of private to total debt securities (domestic); Ratio of new corporate bond issues to GDP |
| Efficiency | Net interest margin; Lending-deposits spread; Non-interest income to total income; Overhead costs (% of total assets); Profitability (return on assets, return on equity); Boone indicator (or Herfindahl or H-statistics) | Turnover ratio for stock market; Price synchronicity (co-movement); Private information trading; Price impact; Liquidity/transaction costs; Quoted bid-ask spread for government bonds; Turnover of bonds (private, public) on securities exchange; Settlement efficiency |
| Stability | Z-score; Capital adequacy ratios; Asset quality ratios; Liquidity ratios; Others (net foreign exchange position to capital etc.) | Volatility (standard deviation / average) of stock price index, sovereign bond index; Skewness of the index (stock price, sovereign bond); Vulnerability to earnings manipulation; Price/earnings ratio; Duration; Ratio of short-term to total bonds (domestic, int’l); Correlation with major bond returns (German, US) |
