= Trade repository =

Collects records of over-the-counter (OTC) derivatives

A Trade Repository or Swap Data Repository is an entity that centrally collects and maintains the records of over-the-counter (OTC) derivatives. These electronic platforms, acting as authoritative registries of key information regarding open OTC derivatives trades, provide an effective tool for mitigating the inherent opacity of OTC derivatives markets.

This market infrastructure is defined and supervised in Europe by the European Securities and Markets Authority (ESMA) under the European Market Infrastructure Regulation (EMIR). Similar regulatory initiatives are conducted in the United States where the Commodity Futures Trading Commission (CFTC) has developed the Dodd-Frank Act regulation, under which Swap Data Repositories are regulated.

The strengthening of the derivatives markets regulatory framework finds its origin in the 26 September 2009 summit in Pittsburgh, where G20 Leaders agreed that all standardised OTC derivative contracts should be cleared through central counterparties (CCP) by end-2012 at the latest and that OTC derivative contracts should be reported to trade repositories.

== EU Legislative Proposals ==
Adoption of the regulatory and implementing technical standards for the Regulation on OTC derivatives, central counterparties and trade repositories

On 19 December 2012, the European Commission has adopted nine regulatory and implementing technical standards to complement the obligations defined under the Regulation on OTC derivatives, central counterparties (CCPs) and trade. They were developed by the European Supervisory Authorities and have been endorsed by the European Commission without modification.

The adoption of these technical standards finalises requirements for the mandatory clearing and reporting of transactions, in line with the EU's G20 commitment made in Pittsburgh in September 2009.

== List of trade repositories ==
As updated in late 2022 by the Financial Stability Board:

- Australia: DTCC, HKMA-TR, UnaVista
- Brazil: B3
- Canada: CME, DTCC, ICE Trade Vault, KOR
- China: CFETS, CFMMC, CSIS, NAFMII
- European Union: DTCC, KDPW, REGIS-TR, UnaVista
- Hong Kong: HKMA-TR
- India: Clearing Corporation of India
- Japan: DTCC
- South Korea: KRX
- Russia: National Settlement Depository, SPBEX
- Saudi Arabia: SIMAH National Trade Repository
- Singapore: DTCC
- Switzerland: DTCC, REGIS-TR, SIX Trade Repository
- Turkey: Central Registry Agency
- United Kingdom: DTCC, ICE Trade Vault, REGIS-TR, UnaVista
- United States: CME, DTCC, ICE Trade Vault, KOR
