= China Securities Depository and Clearing Corporation =

Chinese company

中国证券登记结算有限责任公司 China Securities Depository and Clearing Corporation Limited
- Type: Limited Company
- Founded: March 30, 2001
- Headquarters: 17 Taipingqiao Dajie; Xicheng District; Beijing, China
- Area served: China
- Key people: Zhuang Mu, President
- Products: Depository and clearing for securities exchanged on SSE and SZSE
- Owner: Shanghai Stock Exchange (50%); Shenzhen Stock Exchange (50%)
- Website: ChinaClear(in Chinese)

China Securities Depository and Clearing Corporation Limited (Chinese: 中国证券登记结算有限责任公司), in short CSDC, SD&C, or ChinaClear (Chinese: 中国结算 or 中证登, Zhongzhengdeng), is a central counterparty and central securities depository of China, based in Beijing. It is responsible for all securities depository and clearing services for the Shanghai Stock Exchange and Shenzhen Stock Exchange, thus playing a similar role as that of DTCC for the US stock markets.

== Overview ==
CSDC was set up on March 30, 2001. In September 2001, Shanghai Securities Central Depository and Clearing Corporation and Shenzhen Securities Depository Corporation, two corporations which were in responsible for depository and clearing services of Shanghai Stock Exchange and Shenzhen Stock Exchange, were merged into the CSDC. It is a non-profit entity established with the approval of the China Securities Regulatory Commission.

== See also ==
- China Central Depository & Clearing (ChinaBond)
- Shanghai Clearing House
- Shanghai-Hong Kong Stock Connect and Shenzhen-Hong Kong Stock Connect
- Asia-Pacific Central Securities Depository Group
- CCP Global
