= Central counterparty clearing =

Category of financial market infrastructure

A central clearing counterparty (CCP), also referred to as a central counterparty, is a financial market infrastructure organization that takes on counterparty credit risk between parties to a transaction and provides clearing and settlement services for trades in foreign exchange, securities, options, and derivative contracts. CCPs are highly regulated institutions that specialize in managing counterparty credit risk. An extensive overview of the academic literature can be found in Berndsen (2021).

CCPs "mutualize" (share among their members) counterparty credit risk in the markets in which they operate. A CCP reduces the settlement risks by netting offsetting transactions between multiple counterparties, by requiring collateral deposits (also called "margin deposits"), by providing independent valuation of trades and collateral, by monitoring the creditworthiness of the member firms, and in many cases, by providing a guarantee fund that can be used to cover losses that exceed a defaulting member's collateral on deposit. CCPs require a pre-set amount of collateral — referred to as ‘initial margin’ — to be posted to the CCP by each party in a transaction. The first line of defense is collateral provided by the defaulting member. CCPs typically adjust initial margin demands in response to changes in market conditions. For instance, a CCP may increase initial margin requirements in response to high price volatility. Variation margin is the second line of defense against fluctuation in the prices of securities pledged as collateral. If those prices fall, the member must deposit a corresponding amount of cash, and if those prices go up, the member may withdraw a corresponding amount of cash. This is done either on a daily basis or sometimes more frequently. For some financial products, members’ net payment obligations to or from the CCP are settled on a daily basis (or more frequently if there are large movements during the course of the day) to prevent the build-up of large exposures. The advantages of a central counterparty clearing arrangement are greater transparency of the risks, reduced processing costs, and greater certainty in cases of default by a member. Once a trade has been executed by two counterparties, it is submitted to a clearing house, which then steps between the two original traders' clearing firms and assumes the legal counterparty risk for the trade. For example, a trade between member firm A and firm B becomes two trades: A-CCP and CCP-B. This process is called novation.

As the CCP concentrates the risk of settlement failures into itself and is able to isolate the effects of a failure of a market participant, it also needs to be properly managed and well-capitalized in order to ensure its survival in the event of a significant adverse event, such as a large clearing firm defaulting. Guarantee funds are capitalized with collateral from the member firms and own capital, called 'skin-in-the-game' of the CCP. In the event of a settlement failure, the defaulting firm may be declared to be in default and the CCP's default procedures utilized, which may include the orderly liquidation of the defaulting firm's positions and collateral. In the event of a significant clearing firm failure, the CCP may draw on its guarantee fund in order to settle trades on behalf of the failed clearing firm.

Nonetheless, it is possible that, in extreme circumstances, CCPs could be a source of systemic risk.

CCPs have a trade association representing them called CCP Global.

== History ==
=== Post-2008 financial crisis ===
Due to the 2008 financial crisis, the G20 leaders agreed at the 2009 G20 Pittsburgh summit that all standardised derivatives contracts should be traded on exchanges or electronic trading platforms and cleared through central counterparties (CCPs). In the United States, as part of the Obama financial regulatory reform plan of 2009, pressure has been placed on traders of derivatives such as credit default swaps (CDS) to make their trades on an open exchange with a clearinghouse. In June 2009, Federal Reserve official Alfred Kohn mentioned that the largest CDS dealers were working on an exchange, and that only regulatory approval rather than legislation would be required. In March 2010, the Options Clearing Corporation (OCC) stated that it was moving forward in backing equity derivatives. In Europe, the European Market Infrastructure Regulation mandated central clearing. It is estimated that almost half of all outstanding interest rate swap transactions are centrally cleared. The systemic importance of CCPs is expected to increase further as the central clearing of standardized over-the-counter (OTC) derivatives becomes mandatory in line with commitments made by G20 leaders following the crisis. The Financial Stability Board reported in April 2013 that, as at the end of February 2013, around US$158 trillion of interest rate swaps and over US$2.6 trillion of OTC credit derivatives were centrally cleared, representing 41% and 12% respectively of total outstanding notional amounts.

== Securities (US) ==
DTCC's subsidiary the National Securities Clearing Corporation (NSCC) clears broker-to-broker trades using its Continuous Net Settlement (CNS) System. This has acted as a CCP, long before the term was coined. In order to deal with the default of a member broker, as happened with Drexel Burnham and Lehman Brothers, DTCC has a guarantee fund to which all broker members contribute. It also has rules to handle the gains and losses from a defaulting broker. The guarantee fund ensures that settlement can be completed. A defaulting member's contribution to the fund, along with any other assets held by the depository, are used to absorb any losses at the time of default.

The options market, with its Options Clearing Corporation (OCC), also acts as a central clearing counterparty. Its rules stipulate a five-step "waterfall" in dealing with a member's default:

1. The margin deposits of the suspended firm
2. Clearing fund deposits of the suspended firm
3. Clearing fund deposits of non-defaulting firms
4. OCC retained earnings
5. Clearing fund assessments

In order to assess the viability of its funds, the OCC carries out a firm-wide default test annually. In addition, the firm performs smaller, limited scope defaults throughout the year. Results are reported to its Enterprise Risk Management Committee.

== Europe ==
LCH.Clearnet, the result of a merger between the London Clearing House and Clearnet, acts as a CCP for a wide variety of financial products, from equities and commodities to credit default swaps and interest rate swaps.

== Asia ==
Asian countries have addressed the needs of their derivative markets by forming CCPs. Shanghai Clearing House, formed in 2009, acts as a CCP for a wide range of financial products in China.

== See also ==
- CCP Global
- Central securities depository
- Clearing (finance)
- Swap execution facility
