= China Central Depository & Clearing =

Financial infrastructure in China

中央国债登记结算有限责任公司 China Central Depository & Clearing Co., Ltd.
- Company type: State-owned enterprise, Limited Company
- Founded: 1996
- Headquarters: 10 Jinrong Street; Xicheng District; Beijing, China
- Area served: China
- Key people: Shui Ruqing, President
- Products: Depository and clearing for government bonds of People's Republic of China
- Owner: Ministry of Finance of the People's Republic of China (100%, Representing State Council of the People's Republic of China)
- Website: CCDC(in Chinese); ChinaBond(in Chinese)

The China Central Depository & Clearing Co., Ltd. (Chinese: 中央国债登记结算有限责任公司), in short CCDC, CDC, or ChinaBond (Chinese: 中央结算公司, 中债公司 or 中债登 Zhongzhaideng), formerly also translated as China Government Securities Depository Trust & Clearing Co., is a central securities depository (CSD) for Chinese bonds and other fixed-income securities, based in Beijing with a secondary headquarters in Shanghai.

It was originally set up by the People's Bank of China as China Securities Trading System Co., Ltd. (Chinese: 中国证券交易系统有限公司) in 1993, and reorganized into CCDC in 1996.

CCDC is one of China's three dominant CSDs, together with China Securities Depository and Clearing Corporation (CSDC) and the Shanghai Clearing House (SHCH).

== Overview ==
CCDC is a wholly state-owned central institution. It started as a centralized depository for government bonds, and has expanded into providing registration, custody and settlement services under the approval and funding of the State Council.

In July 2015, CCDC established a branch in Shanghai, reorganized as a "Shanghai headquarters" in December 2017, with a mandate to develop five platforms: the RMB bond cross-border issuance center, RMB bond cross-border settlement center, ChinaBond collateral business center, ChinaBond pricing center, and Shanghai data center. In 2018, the Shanghai headquarters of CCDC facilitated the issuance of bonds in the following market segments: local government bonds (99 issues, raising RMB 482.8 billion); corporate bonds (66 issues, RMB 61.2 billion); asset-backed securities (12 issues, RMB 64.6 billion); and other financial bonds (2 issues, RMB 6 billion).

CCDC runs a national depository system of government bonds under the permission of Ministry of Finance of the People's Republic of China.

== See also ==
- China Securities Depository and Clearing Corporation (ChinaClear)
- Shanghai Clearing House
- Central Moneymarkets Unit in Hong Kong
- Asia-Pacific Central Securities Depository Group
