= People's Bank of China =

Central bank of the People's Republic of China

People's Bank of China 中国人民银行

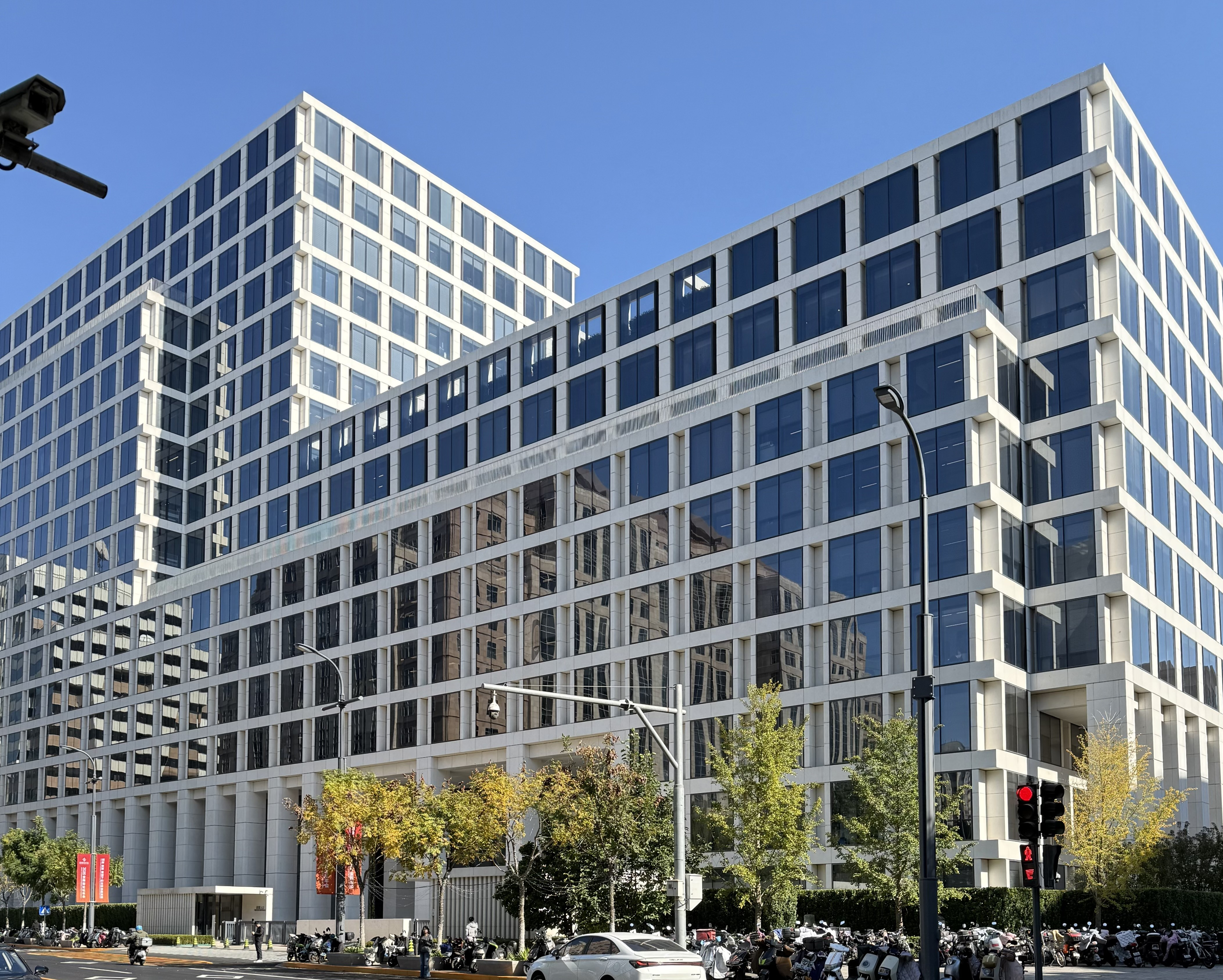
- People's Bank head office in Beijing
- Central bank of: China
- Headquarters: Beijing; Shanghai
- Coordinates: Beijing; 39°54′24″N 116°21′14″E
- Established: December 1, 1948; 77 years ago
- Key people: Pan Gongsheng, Governor and CCP Committee Secretary
- Currency: Renminbi (RMB); CNY (ISO 4217)
- Reserves: US$3.45 trillion (2023)
- Reserve requirements: 6.6%
- Bank rate: 3.4%
- Website: www.pbc.gov.cn

People's Bank of China

Chinese name
- Simplified Chinese: 中国人民银行
- Traditional Chinese: 中國人民銀行
- Literal meaning: China People Bank
Transcriptions
Standard Mandarin
- Hanyu Pinyin: Zhōngguó Rénmín Yínháng
- Bopomofo: ㄓㄨㄥㄍㄨㄛˊ ㄖㄣˊㄇㄧㄣˊ ㄧㄣˊㄏㄤˊ
- Gwoyeu Romatzyh: Jonggwo Renming Ynharng
- Wade–Giles: Chung^{1}kuo^{2} Jen^{2}ming^{2} yin^{2}hang^{2}
- Yale Romanization: Jung^{1}gwo^{2} ren^{2}min^{2} yin^{2}hang^{2}
Yue: Cantonese
- Yale Romanization: Jūnggwok Yàhnmàhn Ngàhnhòhng
- Jyutping: Zung^{1}gwok^{3} Jan^{4}man^{4} Ngan^{4}hong^{4}

Alternative Chinese name
- Simplified Chinese: 人民银行
- Traditional Chinese: 人民銀行
- Literal meaning: People Bank
Transcriptions
Standard Mandarin
- Hanyu Pinyin: Rénmín Yínháng
- Bopomofo: ㄖㄣˊㄇㄧㄣˊ ㄧㄣˊㄏㄤˊ
- Gwoyeu Romatzyh: Renmin Ynharng
- Wade–Giles: Jen^{2}ming^{2} yin^{2}hang^{2}
- Yale Romanization: Ren^{2}min^{2} yin^{2}hang^{2}
Yue: Cantonese
- Yale Romanization: Yàhnmàhn Ngàhnhòhng
- Jyutping: Jan^{4}man^{4} ngan^{4}hong^{4}

Second alternative Chinese name
- Chinese: 央行
- Literal meaning: Central Bank
Transcriptions
Standard Mandarin
- Hanyu Pinyin: Yāngháng
- Gwoyeu Romatzyh: IangHarng
- Wade–Giles: Yang^{1}hang^{2}
- Yale Romanization: Yang^{1}hang^{2}
Yue: Cantonese
- Yale Romanization: Yēunghòhng
- Jyutping: Joeng^{1}hong^{4}

Tibetan name
- Tibetan: ཀྲུང་གོ་མི་དམངས། མི་རྣམས།དངུལ་ཁང་།
Transcriptions
- Wylie: Krung go mi dmangs Mi rnams Dngul khang

Zhuang name
- Zhuang: Cunghgoz Yinzminz Yinzhangz

Mongolian name
- Mongolian Cyrillic: Дундад Улсын Ардын Банк
- Mongolian script: ᠳᠤᠮᠳᠠᠳᠤ ᠤᠯᠤᠰ ᠤᠨ ᠠᠷᠠᠳ ᠤᠨ ᠪᠠᠩᠬᠢ
Transcriptions
- SASM/GNC: Dundad Ulsyn Ardyn Bank

Uyghur name
- Uyghur: جۇڭگو خەلق بانكا
Transcriptions
- Latin Yëziqi: Junggo Xelq Banka
- Siril Yëziqi: Җуңго Хәлқ Банка

Portuguese name
- Portuguese: Banco Popular da China

The People's Bank of China (officially PBC and unofficially PBOC) is the central bank of the People's Republic of China. It is responsible for carrying out monetary policy as determined by the PRC People's Bank Law and the PRC Commercial Bank Law.

The PBC was established in 1948 as the bank serving areas of mainland China under Chinese Communist Party (CCP) control and became China's sole central bank after the founding of the People's Republic of China in 1949. From 1969 to 1978, the PBC was demoted to a bureau of the Ministry of Finance. The PBC was extensively reformed during the 1990s, when its provincial and local branches were abolished, instead opening nine regional branches. In 2023, these reforms were reversed as when the regional branches were abolished and the provincial branches restored, and new arrangements essentially ended the PBC's longstanding role in financial supervision.

The PBC is the 25th-ranked of 26 ministerial-level departments of the State Council. The PBC lacks central bank independence and is required to implement the policies of the CCP under the direction of the party's Central Financial Commission, which is currently led by premier Li Qiang. The PBC is led by a governor assisted by several deputy governors and a CCP Committee Secretary. Since 2023, the roles of governor and CCP Committee Secretary have been held jointly by Pan Gongsheng.

== History ==
=== Mao era ===
The bank was established on 1948–12-1 by merger of three of several regional CCP-run financial entities, respectively the Huabei Bank (華北銀行, active in North China), Beihai Bank (in Shandong), and Xibei Farmers Bank (in Northwestern China). The new bank was first headquartered at the former Huabei Bank head office in Shijiazhuang, then moved to Beijing in 1949. All other mainland Chinese banks were either liquidated or nationalized in the early 1950s, so that between 1955 and 1978 the PBC was the only bank in the PRC's single-tier banking system and was responsible for all central banking and commercial banking operations. All other banks within mainland China such as the Bank of China were either organized as divisions of the PBC, or were non-deposit-taking agencies.

During the Cultural Revolution, the PBC suspended its commercial banking service. In June 1969, the State Council approved the consolidation of PBC's headquarters as a bureau within the Ministry of Finance. In that context, the PBC's head office was downsized to no more than eighty staff. Local PBC branches were correspondingly merged into local government finance departments.

=== Early reform era ===
The institutional demotion of the PBC was reversed in March 1978 as it was separated from the Finance Ministry and granted ministerial ranking.

By then and with the exception of special allocations for rural development, the monolithic PBC dominated all business transactions and credit. In 1979, China initiated a transition from that single-tier banking system to a two-tier system, which was largely completed by 1984. In March 1979, as part of the reform and opening up, the State Council split off state-owned banks from the PBC, first the Agricultural Bank of China (ABC) and the Bank of China (BOC). The People's Construction Bank of China, which had been run separately under the Ministry of Finance, was also made autonomous (and later renamed China Construction Bank in 1986). In January 1984, the PBC's own commercial banking operations were spun off as the Industrial and Commercial Bank of China (ICBC). In September 1983, the State Council had promulgated that the PBC would function exclusively as the central bank of China and no longer undertake commercial banking activities.

Modernization efforts continued in the late 1980s and early 1990s. In 1990, the PBC moved into its new head office building, prominently located on West Chang'an Avenue. In 1991, Vice Governor Chen Yuan spearheaded the creation of the Electronic Interbank System (EIS), the PBC's first state-of-the-art financial market infrastructure. In 1992, however, the PBC had to reluctantly concede the spinning off of its securities regulatory duties to the newly established China Securities Regulatory Commission, whose first chair was former PBC vice governor Liu Hongru.

As part of the State Council's 1993 Resolution on Financial System Reform and its effort to modernize the financial sector, the PBC was assigned the role of managing the currency and preserving macroeconomic and financial stability.

The bank's profile was greatly raised by the appointment of Zhu Rongji as its governor in 1993, simultaneously as his role as Vice Premier in charge of economic and financial affairs. Its central bank status was legally confirmed on March 18, 1995, by the 3rd Plenum of the 8th National People's Congress, and was granted a higher degree of autonomy than other State Council ministries by an act that year. In 1996 and 1996, the PBC established fundamental regulations on loans and consumer credit.

In 1998, the PBC underwent a major restructuring. All provincial and local branches were abolished, and the PBC opened nine regional branches, whose boundaries did not correspond to local administrative boundaries. The nine branches were located in Chengdu, Guangzhou, Jinan, Nanjing, Shanghai, Shenyang, Tianjin, Wuhan, and Xi'an, complemented by a sub-provincial network of city-level and county-level sub-branches. That same year, the so-called credit plan, a key feature of China's former state planning process, was finally abandoned, allowing the PBC to play a genuine role as monetary policy authority.

=== 21st century ===
In 2003, the Standing Committee of the National People's Congress approved an amendment law for strengthening the role of PBC in the making and implementation of monetary policy for safeguarding the overall financial stability and provision of financial services. That year, the long overdue restructuring of China's banking sector made major progress with the creation of Central Huijin Investment, a PBC-managed fund that allowed the PBC to take the lead from the Ministry of Finance on the restructuring process and from the CCP Central Organization Department on the appointment of senior bank executives. That same year, however, the PBC reluctantly lost its direct authority over banking supervision with the creation of the China Banking Regulatory Commission.

In 2005, the PBC elevated its branch in Shanghai to the status of "second head office", in a move intended to mirror the prominent market-facing role of the Federal Reserve Bank of New York within the US Federal Reserve System. In 2006, the PBC established the Credit Reference Centre to provide financial credit reporting. In 2008, the PBC lost the direct ownership stakes it had built up in much of China's financial sector as the ownership of Central Huijin was transferred to the China Investment Corporation (CIC), a newly created sovereign wealth fund.

During the Great Recession, the PBC helped address bank liquidity crisis by signing swap agreements with numerous other countries to provide them with liquidity based on the renminbi. As of 2021, China has swap agreements with 40 countries.

In 2010, the PBC issued administrative measures regarding online non-financial payment services. These measures retroactively recognized the legal status of online third-party payment platforms like Alipay. Prior to the 2010 measures, these services existed in a legal grey area.

In 2015, the PBC hosted China's first formal deposit insurance scheme. In 2019, this scheme was reorganized as a subsidiary of the PBC, the Deposit Insurance Fund Management Company. Meanwhile, in 2017, the PBC was tasked with the secretariat of China's newly established Financial Stability and Development Committee chaired by Vice Premier Liu He. In 2020, the PBC initiated supervision of significant financial holding companies.

The PBC underwent another major restructuring in 2023 as part of the plan on reforming Party and state institutions, with the abolition of the nine regional branches established in 1998, which had already seen their authority watered down by a change in 2004 that had returned authority to the PBC's branches at the provincial level and further changes in 2018. Additionally, the PBC's county-level branches were absorbed by city-level branches. The new branches were inaugurated on August 18, 2023. The oversight over financial holding companies and financial consumer protection was also transferred from the PBC to the newly established National Financial Regulatory Administration (NFRA). Around 1,600 county-level branches of the PBC are planned to be absorbed to the NFRA; the PBC had 1,761 such branches at the end of 2021.

== Operations ==
The PBC is a cabinet-level executive department of the State Council. The top management of the PBC are composed of the governor and a certain number of deputy governors. The governor is nominated by the premier of the State Council, who is then approved by the National People's Congress or its Standing Committee and appointed by the president.The deputy governors of the PBC are appointed to or removed from office by the premier.

The PBC adopts the governor responsibility system under which the governor supervises the overall work of the PBC while the deputy governors provide assistance to the governor to fulfill his or her responsibility. The current governor is Pan Gongsheng. Deputy governors of the management team include: Zhu Hexin, Zhang Qingsong, Xuan Changneng, Lu Lei, and Tao Ling. The PBC does not have central bank independence and is required to implement the policies of the Chinese Communist Party (CCP). It operates under the direction of the CCP's Central Financial Commission. The CCP committee secretary of the PBC is the most powerful position in the bank and can hold more sway than the governor.

The current CCP committee secretary is Pan Gongsheng.

The PBC Monetary Policy Committee is an advisory body chaired by the PBC governor. It typically includes the directors and deputy directors of other financial agencies, as well as a few influential academic economists.

=== Central departments ===
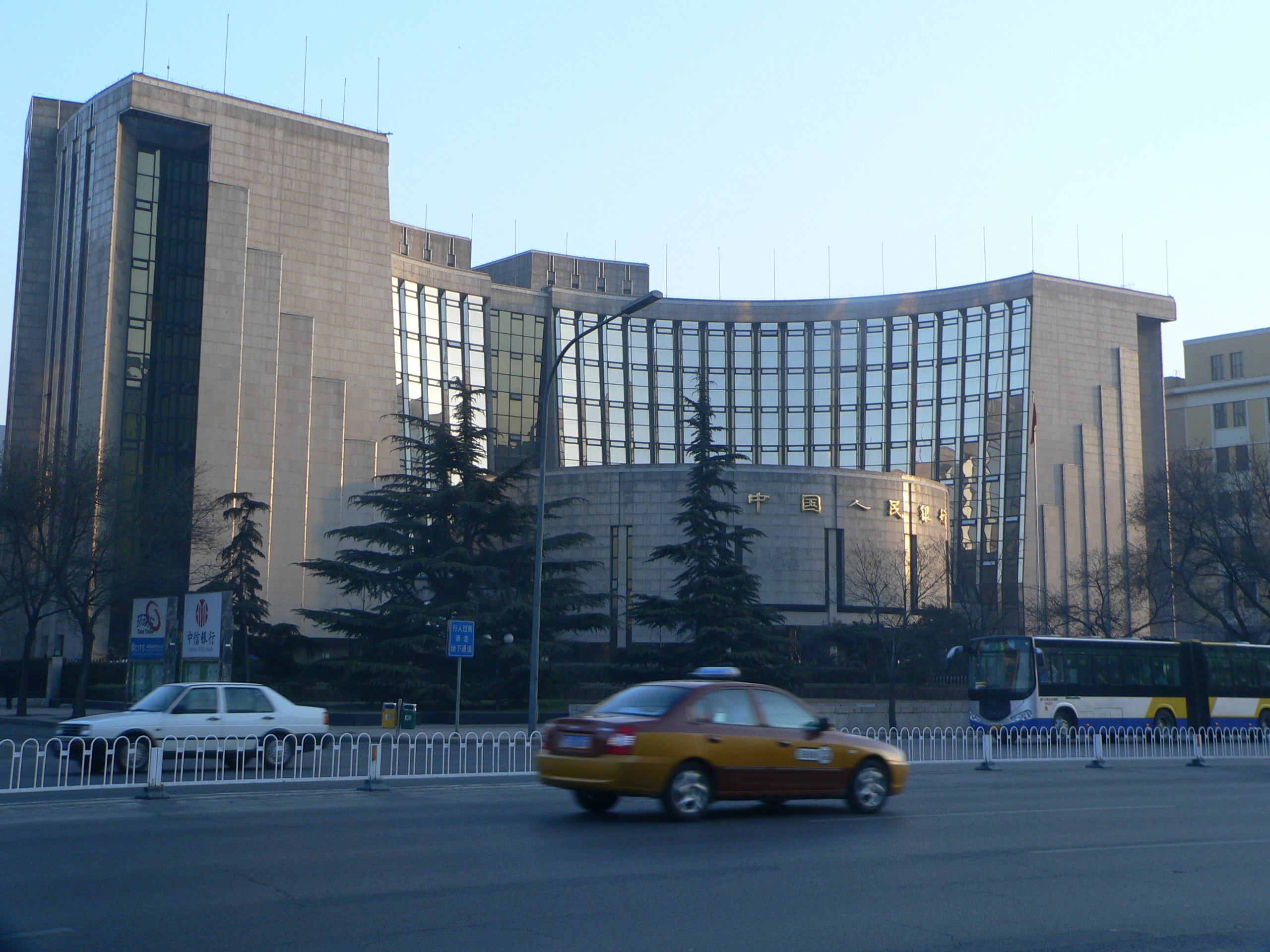
Former PBC head office building from 1990 to 2021

The current head office building of the PBC was inaugurated in 2021 on Beijing Financial Street in Beijing. It replaced an earlier building bordering West Chang'an Avenue, constructed in 1987–1990 on a design by a team of architects led by Zhou Ru. That building's shape referred to two traditional Chinese motifs, namely yuanbao ingots and "wealth vases" (Chinese: Jùbǎopén) from Chinese folklore. It remains used by the PBC following the 2021 relocation.

As of 2019, the PBC consisted of functional departments (bureaus) as below:

- General Administration Department (General Office of the CCP PBC Committee)
- Legal Affairs Department
- Monetary Policy Department
- Macroprudential Policy Bureau
- Financial Market Department
- Financial Stability Bureau
- Statistics and Analysis Department
- Accounting and Treasury Department
- Payment System Department
- Technology Department
- Currency, Gold and Silver Bureau
- State Treasury Bureau
- International Department
- Internal Auditing Department
- Human Resources Department (Organization Division of the CCP PBC Committee)
- Research Bureau
- Credit Information System Bureau
- Anti-Money Laundering Bureau (Security Bureau)
- Financial Consumer Protection Bureau
- Education Department of the CCP PBC Committee
- CCP Committee of the PBC Head Office (Office of Inspections)
- Retired Staff Management Bureau
- Office of Senior Advisors
- Staff Union Committee
- Youth League

=== Branches and offices ===
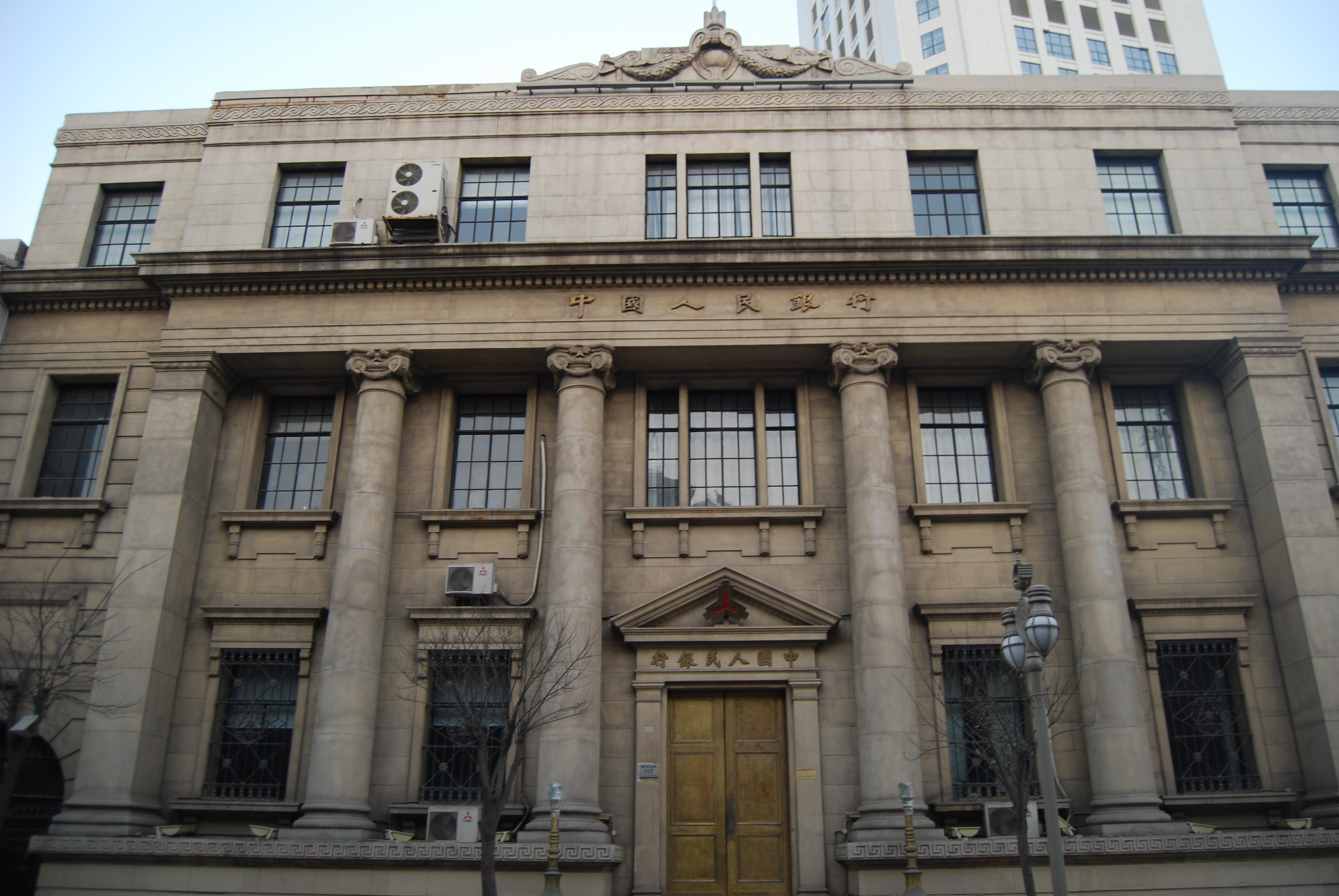
People's Bank of China Tianjin branch, formerly the Central Bank Tientsin Branch building until 1949, now a protected heritage site

The PBC has branches in each 31 provincial-level administrative divisions in China, branches in five cities (Shenzhen, Dalian, Ningbo, Qingdao, and Xiamen), and 317 branches in prefecture-level divisions.

It has 6 overseas representative offices (PBC Representative Office for America, PBC Representative Office (London) for Europe, PBC Tokyo Representative Office, PBC Frankfurt Representative Office, PBC Representative Office for Africa, Liaison Office of the PBC in the Caribbean Development Bank).

=== Affiliate institutions ===
The following enterprises and institutions were directly under the PBC as of 2012:

- China Anti-Money Laundering Monitoring and Analysis Center
- PBC Graduate School
- China Financial Publishing House
- Financial News
- China National Clearing Center
- China Banknote Printing and Minting Corporation
- China Gold Coin Incorporation
- China Financial Computerization Corporation
- China Foreign Exchange Trade System

The PBC is active in promoting financial inclusion policy and a member of the Alliance for Financial Inclusion.

== Role in green finance ==
Since the early 2000s, the PBOC has progressively integrated sustainability into its prudential and monetary policy framework, steering green finance in China. This evolution began in the mid-2007 with the "Guidelines on Credit Work for Energy Conservation and Emission Reduction" guidelines policy, but accelerated significantly in 2016 with the release of the "Guiding Opinions on Building a Green Financial System". Following China's climate commitment, the PBOC further elevated green finance to a macro-strategic priority, aligned with the national "Five Key Pillars" strategy announced in 2024 by the State Council. The People's Bank of China also plays an international role in this field. It is a founding member of the Network for Greening the Financial System (NGFS), which was launched in 2017.

=== Policy instruments ===
The People's Bank of China's policy strategy traditionally relied on informal "window guidance". From 2007 the central bank informally nudged banks away from originating new credit from high-polluting sectors. It has since evolved towards using more market-based instruments to align with China's maturing financial system. The following key policy instruments have been implemented:

- Carbon Emission Reduction Facility (CERF): launched in November 2021, the CERF is a structural refinancing operation designed to provide low-cost funding to financial institutions for carbon-reduction projects and has resulted in an estimated annual reduction of 200 million tons of carbon emissions.
- Collateral policy: The Chinese central bank was among the first central banks to use its collateral eligibility framework to incentivize green finance. In 2018, the PBOC expanded the list of eligible collateral for its MLF to include green financial bonds. This policy led to a significant decrease in credit spreads, with researchers measuring a reduction of approximately 12 to 62 basis points in the secondary market. In the primary issuance market, costs fell by between 26 and 54 basis points.
- Evaluation of banks: since 2021, the PBoC has introduced the Green Finance Evaluation Plan for Banking Financial Institutions, which assesses and grades the overall green performance of 24 major national banks and over 3,000 local institutions. Over time, this framework has gradually evolved into a ranking system of banks, whose results are incorporated into the PBOC's broader macroprudential assessment of financial institutions, directly influencing their regulatory ratings.

=== International comparisons ===
The PBOC's proactive stance has been recognized internationally; an international ranking by the think tank Positive Money ranked PBoC' green policies as the most developed among the ASEAN Plus Three nations, achieving the highest scores in both monetary and financial policy categories.

Studies suggest that the PBoC's lack of political independence allows it to implement direct green monetary policies more effectively than its Western counterparts, which are often guided by the principle of "market neutrality".

== See also ==
- Internationalization of the renminbi
- List of central banks
- History of banking in China
