= Column N.A. =

Column National Association
- Type: National bank (National Association)
- Industry: Banking, Financial services
- Founded: March 28, 2006; 20 years ago (as Northern California National Bank)
- Headquarters: San Francisco, California, U.S.
- Key people: William Hockey (CEO)
- Products: Deposit accounts, ACH, wire transfer, international payments, real-time payments, card issuance, lending
- Website: column.com
- Footnotes; FDIC certificate 58224; OCC charter 24626

Column National Association (branded as Column N.A. or Column) is an American federally chartered bank and technology company headquartered in San Francisco, California. Column operates under a national bank charter granted by the Office of the Comptroller of the Currency (OCC), is a member of the Federal Reserve System, and is insured by the Federal Deposit Insurance Corporation (FDIC).

Column provides programmatic banking services to some of the largest financial technology institutions in the United States, including Ramp, Brex, Mercury, and Bilt. Technology companies and other banks integrate with Column's application programming interfaces (APIs) to embed payment, deposit, and lending capabilities directly into their own products without third-party middleware.

Column is reportedly the largest originator of real-time payments in the United States, and the country's fifth-largest payments originator. It is the largest platform bank in the country and had the highest return on equity of any bank in that category in 2025. Column is privately held and, as of reporting through 2026, has not accepted outside venture capital investment.

== History ==
In March 2021, William Hockey filed a Change in Bank Control Act application with the OCC to acquire Northern California National Bank. The OCC approved the application in March 2022. The decision to acquire a bank was informed by Hockey's earlier work as a co-founder of Plaid, where he heard recurring complaints from customers about outdated technology at the smaller banks willing to partner with fintech companies.

Rather than operating on a third-party legacy core banking system, Column built its own core and ledger after the 2021 acquisition. Column publicly launched in April 2022 under its new name, positioning itself as the first nationally chartered bank designed specifically to serve software developers and financial technology companies through a developer-first API platform.

The bank maintains direct connections to the Federal Reserve (for Fedwire and FedNow), FedACH, The Clearing House (for real-time payments), card networks, and SWIFT, bypassing correspondent banking intermediaries for many transaction types. The bank initially focused on serving US fintech companies seeking to offer financial services, providing backend infrastructure for payments, deposits, and credit. It has since expanded to be one of the larger banks providing clearing services to both domestic and international banks that need to transact in US dollars.

Hockey has stated that the company is fully owned by himself and employees.

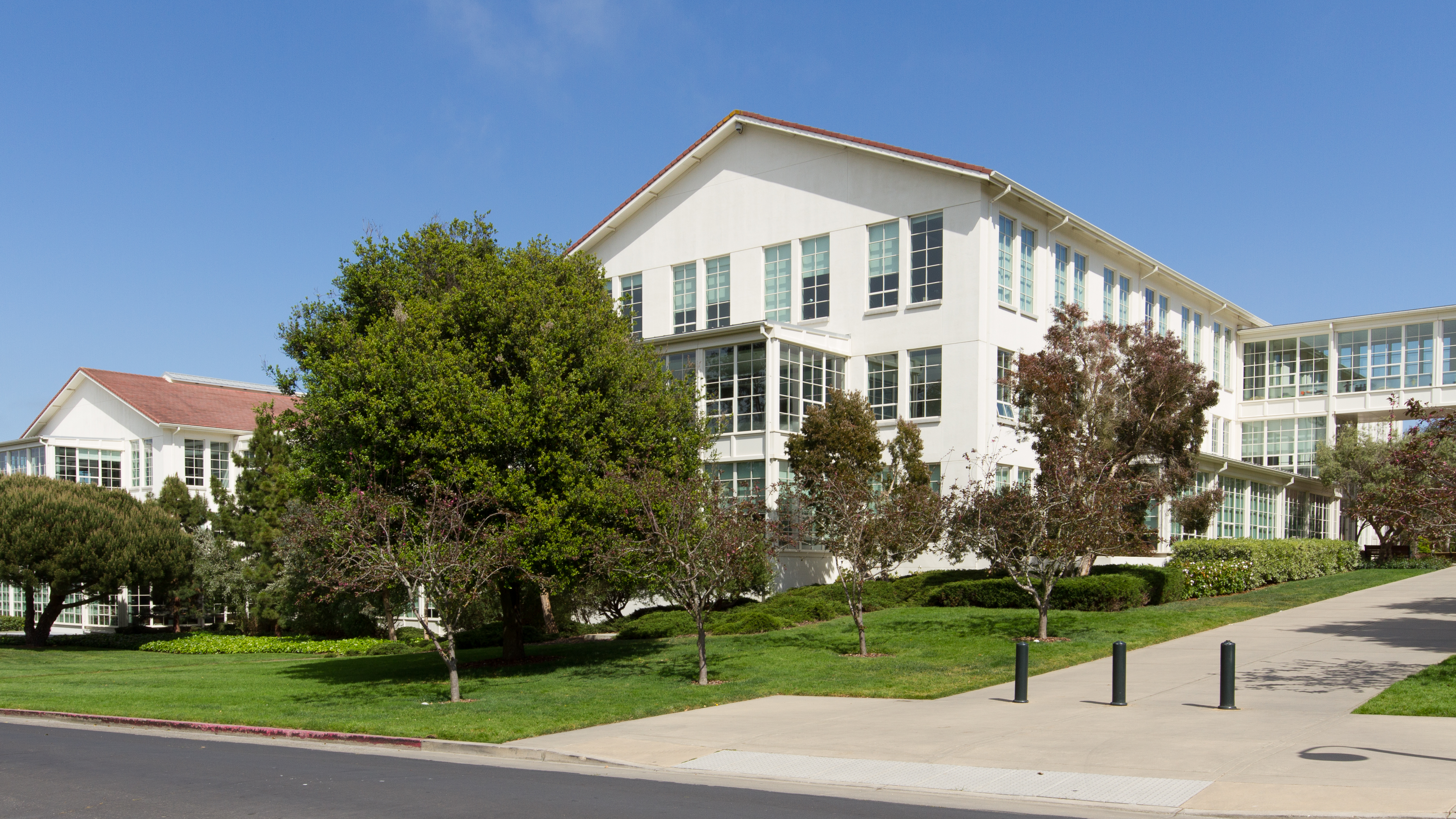
Letterman Digital Arts Center in the Presidio of San Francisco, where Column is headquartered

The bank is headquartered in the 1 Letterman Complex in the Presidio of San Francisco.

== Leadership ==
William Hockey is CEO and co-founder of Column. He previously co-founded Plaid, a financial infrastructure company, where he served as President and Chief Technology Officer. Hockey left his day-to-day role at Plaid in 2019 while retaining a board seat. He studied computer science and economics at Emory University.

== Regulation and oversight ==
Column National Association is a nationally chartered bank subject to supervision and examination by the Office of the Comptroller of the Currency (OCC) under OCC Charter Number 24626. As a national bank, it is a member of the Federal Reserve System. Customer deposits are insured by the Federal Deposit Insurance Corporation (FDIC) up to applicable limits under FDIC Certificate Number 58224.

== Research and publications ==
Column publishes research on geoeconomics and the U.S. dollar, under a site titled Hegemoney. Hockey has stated that "controlling the world's monetary and trade infrastructure is a primary source of American power projection" and that the "United States is sleepwalking our way through a financial cold war [with China]."
