= Clearing house =

Clearing house or Clearinghouse may refer to:

== Banking and finance ==
- Clearing house (finance)
- Automated clearing house
- ACH Network, an electronic network for financial transactions in the U.S.
- Bankers' clearing house
- Cheque clearing
- Clearing House (EU), an EU intelligence body
- Clearing House Association, a New York trade group and banking association
- Clearing House Automated Transfer System (HK), a real-time gross settlement system in Hong Kong
- The Clearing House Payments Company, an American check clearing and wholesale funds transfer company
  - The Clearing House, its parent organization
  - Bank Policy Institute, an entity which subsumed the Clearing House Association, a former arm of The Clearing House
- New York Clearing House, first and largest U.S. bank clearing house
- Pan-European automated clearing house

== Other uses ==
- Access to Information Central Clearing House (UK)
- Central Register and Clearing House, an administrative organization in teacher education in England and Wales
- Clearing House, California
- Packet Clearing House (PCH.net), Internet infrastructure company based in California
- Publishers Clearing House (PCH.com), U.S. direct-marketing company that sells merchandise and magazine subscriptions and operates several prize-based websites
- Railway Clearing House, former UK organization absorbed by the British Railways Board (BRB) in 1963
- WAC Clearinghouse, publishes open-access journals, books, and other resources

== See also ==
- Clearstream and Euroclear, financial firms whose names hint at clearing but are actually central securities depositories
- Clearing (finance)
