= Increase (company) =

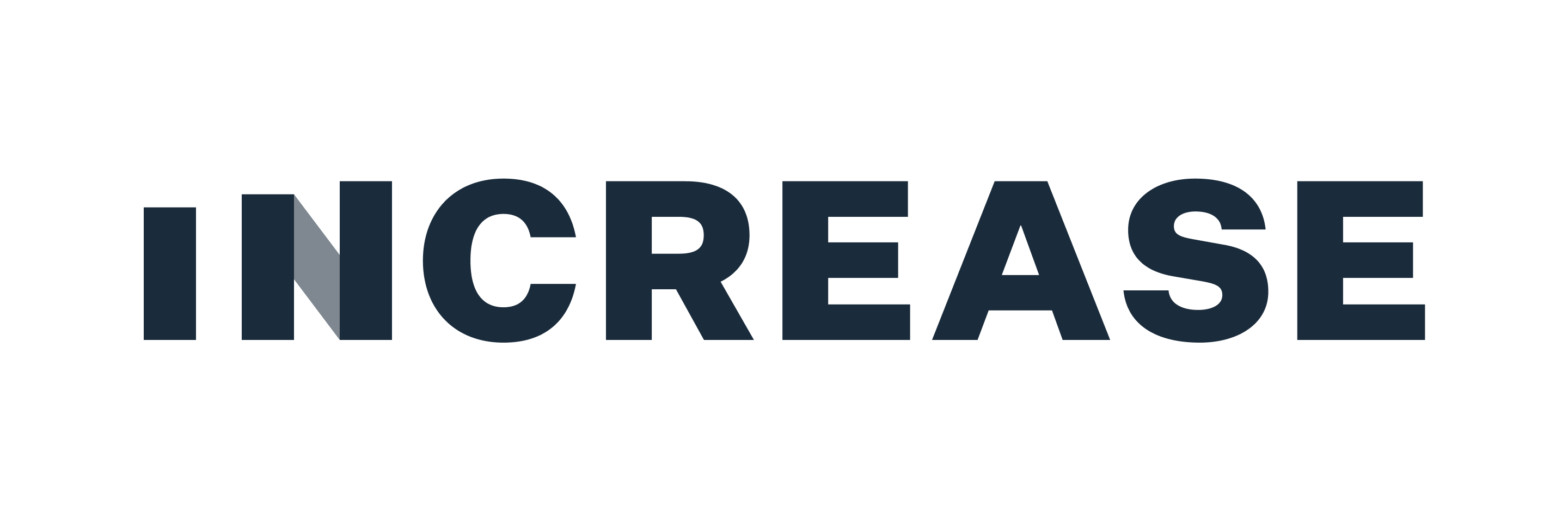
- Type: Private
- Industry: Financial technology
- Founded: 2020
- Founder: Darragh Buckley
- Headquarters: United States
- Products: Banking-as-a-service API platform
- Website: increase.com

Increase is an American financial technology company that provides banking infrastructure for businesses. Its platform allows developers to access banking functions programmatically, including ACH transfers, wire transfers, real-time payments, and card issuing, through connections to financial networks such as FedACH, Fedwire, Check 21, The Clearing House, and Visa.

It processes hundreds of billions in payments volume per year. Increase partners with FDIC-insured banks to offer regulated services.

== History ==
Increase was founded by Darragh Buckley in 2020.

In 2025 and 2026, Increase was included on the Forbes Fintech 50 list. Increase's ACH offering was recognized as part of American Banker's Innovation of the Year in 2025.

The Federal Reserve Bank of San Francisco approved Increase's voting shares acquisition of Twin City Bancorp in June 2025; the acquisition added "bank charter capabilities" to the company.

== Operations ==
Although Increase operates its own core banking system, it connects directly to US financial networks, including the Federal Reserve's Automated Clearing House, Fedwire, Check 21, The Clearing House and Visa, to offer financial services, such as ACH and wire transfers, check transfers and deposits, real-time payments, and card issuing.

The platform enables clients to open bank accounts and automate financial operations through application programming interfaces (APIs). It also provides machine-readable status updates at different stages of a transaction, allowing clients to manage exceptions and failures programmatically rather than through manual processes.
