= EBA Clearing =

Financial infrastructure company

EBA Clearing S.A.S
- Company type: Société par actions simplifiée
- Industry: Finance
- Founded: June 1998
- Founder: Euro Banking Association
- Headquarters: Paris, France
- Products: Clearing House, Payment service provider, Payment systems
- Owner: 53 major European payment banks
- Website: www.ebaclearing.eu

EBA Clearing is a provider of pan-European payment infrastructure wholly owned by shareholders that consist of major European banks. It derives its name from the Euro Banking Association which was instrumental in its establishment in June 1998, but has always been a separate organization.

EBA Clearing owns and operates major payment infrastructure in Europe for Euro payments between banks, including EURO1 for high value payments, STEP1 for payments of small and medium-sized banks, STEP2-T, a pan-European automated clearing house (PE-ACH), and RT1 for instant payments. Both EURO1 and STEP2-T have been identified as Systemically Important Payment Systems by the European Central Bank in 2014, together with TARGET2 and CORE(FR).

EBA Clearing is based in Paris and has representative offices in Brussels, Frankfurt, Helsinki, London and Milan. Given their pan-European significance, both EURO1 and STEP2-T are under direct oversight by the European Central Bank.

== History ==
The origin of EBA Clearing is work by the Legal Task Force of the Euro Banking Association (EBA), which in February 1997 started defining the legal basis for EURO1. Formally created in June 1998, its initial mission was to create and operate the EURO1 platform which went live on 4 January 1999, the same day as TARGET.

In March 2013, EBA Clearing launched MyBank, an e-authorisation solution for online payments, which is geared at facilitating the growth of e-commerce across Europe.

In 2016, banks from nine countries agreed to create RT1, EBA Clearing's pan-European infrastructure for instant payments in Euro, The system went live in November 2017.

== Payment systems ==
=== EURO1 ===
EURO1 is a large-value deferred net settlement (DNS) payment system, owned and operated by EBA Clearing, with a real-time finality concept that reduces but does not eliminate settlement risk. EURO1 settles transactions of high priority and urgency, and primarily of large amount, albeit typically those with lesser urgency and lesser amount than is the case on the T2 platform operated by the Eurosystem which also has a different cost structure.

EURO1 operates on a multilateral net basis, meaning that it continuously adjusts the accounts of the participant banks as they make payments for each other's customers. Payments are settled in real time with finality.

EURO1 is open to banks that have a registered address or branch in the European Union and fulfil a number of additional requirements. It is subject to German law (current account principle/single obligation structure) and is based on a messaging and IT infrastructure provided by SWIFT.

=== STEP1 ===
STEP1 is a payment service of EBA Clearing that started in 2000. It is aimed at small and medium-sized banks for single euro payments of high priority and urgency. The technical infrastructure is the same as that of the EURO1 system, both use the messaging and IT infrastructure of SWIFT.

=== STEP2 ===
STEP2 was put into operation in 2003 in partnership with Italian payment system provider SIA S.p.A. It processes mass payments in euros. Specifically, the umbrella STEP2 system (known as STEP2-T) comprises three Single Euro Payments Area (SEPA) services: SEPA Credit Transfer (STEP2 SCT), SEPA Direct Debit Core (STEP2 SDD Core), and SEPA Direct Debit Business-to-Business (STEP2 SDD B2B).

STEP2-T is a pan-European automated clearing house (PE-ACH), meaning that it complies with the corresponding principles set by the European Payments Council (EPC).

The STEP2 SCT service has been available from the beginning of SEPA on 28 January 2008 across all SEPA countries. The STEP2 SDD Core service started on 2 November 2009, the transposition date of the Payment Services Directive, as well as STEP2 SDD B2B. The STEP2-T platform reaches nearly 100 percent of all banks that have signed the SCT and SDD Scheme Adherence Agreements of the EPC. By the early 2020s, STEP2-T had become the leading retail payment system in the euro area based on volume and value.

=== MyBank ===
MyBank is a pan-European e-authorisation and Online Banking ePayments service that EBA Clearing launched in March 2013. The solution enables customers across Europe to pay for their online purchases via their regular online or mobile banking environment without having to disclose confidential data to the merchant or other third parties. The solution can be used for authorising SEPA Credit Transfers as well as the creation of SDD mandates. At a later stage, MyBank may also be used for transactions in currencies other than euro or for e-identity services.

MyBank is owned and managed by PRETA S.A.S., a wholly owned subsidiary of EBA Clearing.

=== RT1 ===
RT1 is a pan-European instant payment system that provides the European payments industry with a pan-European infrastructure platform for real-time payments in euro under the SEPA Instant Credit Transfer scheme. Launched on 21 November 2017, the RT1 fast payment system allows commercial banks to offer fast payments through this system to their customers throughout the Eurozone.

== Shareholders ==
As of end-2024, the following banks were indicated as shareholders on the EBA Clearing website:

- (Netherlands) ABN AMRO
- (Republic of Ireland) Allied Irish Banks
- (Italy) Banca Monte dei Paschi di Siena
- (Spain) Banco Bilbao Vizcaya Argentaria
- (Italy) Banco BPM
- (Portugal) Banco Comercial Português
- (Spain) Banco Sabadell
- (Spain) Banco Santander
- (Germany) Bank of America Europe
- (Luxembourg) Banque et Caisse d'Épargne de l'État
- (France) Banque Fédérative du Crédit Mutuel
- Banque Internationale à Luxembourg
- (United Kingdom) Barclays
- (France) BNP Paribas
- (France) BPCE
- (Spain) CaixaBank
- (United Kingdom) Citibank Europe
- (Germany) Commerzbank
- (France) Crédit Agricole Corporate and Investment Bank
- (Denmark) Danske Bank
- (Germany) Deutsche Bank
- (Norway) DNB ASA
- (Germany) DZ Bank
- (Austria) Erste Group Bank
- (France) HSBC Continental Europe
- (Netherlands) ING Bank
- (Italy) Intesa Sanpaolo
- (Germany) JPMorgan AG
- (Belgium) KBC Bank
- (Germany) Landesbank Baden-Württemberg
- (Germany) Landesbank Hessen-Thueringen
- (United Kingdom) MUFG Bank Ltd
- National Bank of Greece
- (United Kingdom) National Westminster Bank
- (Finland) Nordea
- (Portugal) Novo Banco
- (Finland) OP Corporate Bank
- (Hungary) OTP Bank
- (Netherlands) Rabobank
- (Austria) Raiffeisen Bank International
- (Sweden) Skandinaviska Enskilda Banken
- (France) Société Générale
- (Germany) Standard Chartered Bank AG
- (Sweden) Svenska Handelsbanken
- (Sweden) Swedbank
- (Switzerland) UBS
- (Germany) UniCredit Bank GmbH
- (Italy) UniCredit

== See also ==
- Clearing House Interbank Payments System
