= EBA =

Eba or EBA may refer to:

== Economics and business ==
- Emergency Banking Act, of the United States Congress
- Euro Banking Association, an industry forum
- Europe Business Assembly, a British vanity award company
- European Banking Authority, a regulatory agency of the European Union
- EBA Clearing, provider of pan-European payment infrastructure
- European Business Association, intra-continental chamber of commerce

== Science ==
- Epidermolysis bullosa acquisita, a chronic subepidermal blistering disease associated with autoimmunity
- 2-Ethoxybenzoic acid
- Evidence based assessment, in psychology
- Expanded bed adsorption, in biochemistry
- Extrastriate body area, a subpart of the extrastriate visual cortex
- Experimental Behavioral Analysis, in behavioral psychology
- Endemic Bird Area, in ecology

== Sports ==
- Eastern Basketball Alliance, a semi-professional men's winter basketball league, 1996–2015
- Eastern Basketball Association, a.k.a. Continental Basketball Association
- English BMX Association, part of British Cycling
- Europe Basketball Academy, in Spain
- Liga EBA, a Spanish basketball championship

== Transportation ==
- Eba Station, in Hiroshima, Japan
- Euxton Balshaw Lane railway station, in England
- Federal Railway Authority (German: Eisenbahn-Bundesamt), in Germany

== Education ==
- Eğitim Bilişim Ağı, electronic educational content network, which founded and operated by Ministry of National Education

== Other ==
- Eba, a Nigerian staple food
- Eba, South Australia, in the Murray Mallee region
- Eba Island, an island in South Australia
- Early Bronze Age
- Elite Beat Agents, a 2006 rhythm game
- Emergency brake assist
- European Broadcasting Area
- Everything but Arms, an initiative of the European Union
- Exclusive buyer agent, represents only buyers of real estate
- Mount Eba Station, a pastoral lease in outback South Australia
- Emergency breathing aid
- "EBA", a song by Kiyo
