= Electronic Payments Network =

US financial clearing house

The Electronic Payments Network (EPN) is an electronic automated clearing house (ACH) operated by The Clearing House Payments Company in the United States. It is one of the only two ACH operators in the country, the other being FedACH, operated by the Federal Reserve Banks.

== Background and history ==
In the late 1960s, due to the increasing volumes of paper processing involved, the clearinghouse associations in the United States formed the Special Committee on Paperless Entries (SCOPE), while the American Bankers Association established a Monetary and Payments System (MAPS). As a result, the first automated clearing house (ACH) association was established in California in 1972, which was followed by the establishment of various ACHs across the United States. The Federal Reserve Bank of San Francisco was the first to operate the ACH in 1972. In 1974, the National Automated Clearing House Association (NACHA) was formed to coordinate the ACHs nationally.

The New York ACH, which was the first private ACH, was established in 1975. It was later renamed as the Electronic Payments Network (EPN). In 1978, the local ACH associations were linked at a nationwide level with the Federal Reserve System. By the late 1980s, four ACH operators operating the United States–American Clearing House Association (ACHA), EPN, FedACH, and Visa. By the early 2000s, only EPN and FedACH, operated by the Federal Reserve Banks, remained as the operating ACHs.

== Operations and ownership ==
The EPN is operated by The Clearing House Payments Company. It is the only private-sector operator in the ACH Network in the United States. The EPN accepts ACH files from originating from the depository financial institutions (ODFIs), sorts and distributes them to the receiving depository financial institutions (RDFIs), thereby effecting a settlement between the financial institutions that are parties to each transaction. The EPN network is fully interoperable, with transactions able to reach any ACH endpoint.

== See also ==
- Clearing House Interbank Payments System
- Fedwire
- National Automated Clearing House
- Universal Payment Identification Code
