= UPIC (disambiguation) =

UPIC may refer to:

- UPIC, computerised musical composition tool
- Universal Payment Identification Code
- Universal Programming Interface for Communication
- University Presidential Inaugural Conference

== See also ==
- Yupik (disambiguation)
