= Eurosystem Collateral Management System =

Financial infrastructure in Europe

The Eurosystem Collateral Management System (ECMS) is a unified platform for collateral management in the Eurosystem, intended to support the effectiveness of monetary policy in the euro area. It is one of the Eurosystem's TARGET Services, together with T2 for large payments, TARGET Instant Payment Settlement (TIPS) for instant payments, and TARGET2-Securities (T2S) for securities settlement.

== Overview ==
The ECMS was implemented on 16 June 2025, replacing the national collateral management systems that had been operated since the inception of economic and monetary union by each National Central Bank.

The ECMS project has been jointly developed by the Bank of France and Bank of Spain on behalf of the Eurosystem. Its start had originally been scheduled in late 2022, but was subsequently postponed several times.

== See also ==
- Marketable collateral
- Monetary Policy
