= Usio, Inc =

American financial technology company

Usio, Inc.
- Formerly: Billserv.com, Inc. Payment Data Systems, Inc.
- Company type: Public
- Traded as: Nasdaq: USIO
- Industry: Financial technology
- Founded: July 1998
- Headquarters: San Antonio, Texas, United States
- Key people: Louis A. Hoch, chairman, president, chief executive
- Website: usio.com

Usio, Inc. is an American financial technology company headquartered in San Antonio, Texas. It provides integrated electronic payment services, including ACH processing, credit card and debit card acceptance, payment facilitation for software platforms, prepaid card issuing and a document print and mail operation.

It is listed on the Nasdaq.

== History ==
Usio was founded in July 1998 as Billserv.com, Inc. before later operating as Payment Data Systems, Inc. and ultimately adopting the Usio, Inc. name. In 2000, Billserv began using MasterCard's payment and presentment network.

In 2016, Louis A. Hoch was appointed chief executive officer.

In September 2017, the company acquired Singular Payments, a payment processor based in Florida. In December 2020, Usio acquired Information Management Solutions LLC, a San Antonio-based print and mail operation, for approximately US$5.9 million in cash and warrants. This acquisition formed the basis of the company's Output Solutions unit.

In June 2021, Usio's listing was upgraded from the Nasdaq Capital Market to the Nasdaq Global Market. During May 2021, the company processed approximately US$1 billion in transaction volume.

In November 2025, Usio acquired PostCredit.

== Operations ==
Usio operates primarily as an embedded payments provider for independent software vendors and software platforms. Its core services encompass ACH credits and debits, credit and debit card acquiring, and payment facilitation. It also manages a prepaid card issuance division and the Output Solutions division, which provides document printing and mailing services for financial institutions, utilities, and government entities.
