= KFTC =

KFTC may refer to:

- KFTC (TV), a television station (channel 26) licensed to Bemidji, Minnesota, United States
- Kentuckians for the Commonwealth, a grassroots environmental organization based out of the commonwealth (state) of Kentucky in the USA
- Korea Financial Telecommunications & Clearings Institute, a non-profit organization which manages several inter-bank payment networks in South Korea
- Korea Fair Trade Commission, South Korea's regulatory authority for economic competition.
- "Keep fucking that chicken", a phrase of encouragement coined by anchorman Ernie Anastos
