= Daylight overdraft =

A daylight overdraft (also called intraday overdraft) occurs where a bank account is allowed to go overdrawn during the day but is brought back into credit by close of business.

== Federal Reserve ==
In the United States, the Federal Reserve operates a system which allows qualifying banks to overdraw on their Federal Reserve accounts in order to make payments via Fedwire. Banks can acquire overdrafts throughout the day to make payments, but must ensure that their accounts are not in a negative position at the end of the day.

Occasionally, banks may not have enough money in their Federal Reserve accounts to fulfill their withdrawals. For example, assume Bank A has $10 million of assets and the Federal Reserve requires 10% of their assets as reserves, which is $1 million. If one day, Bank A needs to transfer out $1.5 million during the day, Bank A is running a daylight overdraft during that day. By the end of that particular day, Bank A has an obligation to pay back the Federal Reserve.

A fee is not imposed on collateralized daylight overdrafts, but a 50-basis point fee is taken on uncollateralized ones.

=== History ===
The history of the daylight overdraft began in 1985 when the Federal Reserve established policies on large amount transfers between different banks, which allow banks to operate smoothly.

=== Problems ===
There are some flaws associated with the system. Sometimes banks are not able to repay the amount that they overdrew during the day since daylight overdraft is ultimately making transactions with funds that are not there at the time the settlement occurs. Banks which need to pay back the Federal Reserve but do not have enough funds to do so have an option to borrow the funds from other banks. However, borrowing from other banks is not always an option. This credit risk is a systemic risk.

=== Risk management ===
The Federal Reserve can take several actions to deal with the risks associated with lending out reserves during the day.

Firstly, the Federal Reserve can monitor a bank borrowing money by what kind of project they are using the reserves for, and by considering the value of other assets that the bank owns.

Secondly, the Federal Reserve can ask for collateral from potential borrowers. In this scenario, collateral works as an insurance for the Federal Reserve in case that the borrower is not able to return the overdraft that occurred during the day.

Thirdly, the Federal Reserve might require the daylight overdraft fee to reduce some risks associated with the overdraft during the day. The banks would not borrow more than the amount that they need in order to avoid a larger fee.

=== Net debit cap ===
Banks who are eligible for daylight overdrafts get a net debit cap. Different organizations hold different net debit caps because it is set by specific regulations and guidelines set up by the Federal Reserve. Along with the policies that the Federal Reserve can enforce, the net debit cap helps the Federal Reserve reduce the risks that they might face with the daylight overdrafts.

Net Debit Cap = Cap Multiple × Capital Measure
