= TARGET2 =

Real-time gross settlement system in the EU

TARGET2 was the real-time gross settlement (RTGS) system for the Eurozone from its phased introduction in 2007-2008 until its replacement with T2 in March 2023. As such, it was one of the Eurosystem's TARGET Services, replacing the original TARGET (Trans-European Automated Real-time Gross Settlement Express Transfer System) RTGS introduced in 1999. Like the other TARGET Services, it was developed and owned by the Eurosystem.

== Overview ==
TARGET2 was based on an integrated central technical infrastructure, known as the Single Shared Platform (SSP). SSP was operated by three providing central banks: France (Banque de France), Germany (Deutsche Bundesbank) and Italy (Banca d'Italia). It started to replace the predecessor system TARGET in November 2007.

TARGET2 was also an interbank RTGS payment system for the clearing of cross-border transfers in the eurozone. Participants in the system were either direct or indirect. Direct participants held an RTGS account and had access to real-time information and control tools. They were responsible for all payments sent from or received on their accounts by themselves or any indirect participants operating through them. Indirect participation meant that payment orders were always sent to and received from the system via a direct participant, with only the relevant direct participant having a legal relationship with the Eurosystem. Finally, bank branches and subsidiaries could choose to participate in TARGET2 as multi-addressee access or addressable BICs.

The Eurosystem in March 2023 switched its real-time gross settlement from TARGET2 to T2, which follows ISO 20022. The switch involved transactions for settling payments related to the Eurosystem's monetary policy operations, as well as bank‑to‑bank and commercial transactions. TARGET2 previously handled transactions for over €2.2 trillion per day.

== History ==
Since the establishment of the European Economic Community in 1958, there has been movement towards an integrated European financial market. This movement has been marked by several events: In the field of payments, the most visible were the launch of the euro in 1999 and the cash changeover in the euro area countries in 2002. The establishment of the large-value central bank payment system TARGET was less visible, but also of great importance. It formed an integral part of the introduction of the euro and facilitated the rapid integration of the euro area money market.

The implementation of TARGET2 was based on a decision of the ECB Council of autumn 2002. TARGET2 started operations on 19 November 2007, when the first group of countries (Austria, Cyprus, Germany, Latvia, Lithuania, Luxembourg, Malta and Slovenia) migrated to the SSP. This first migration was successful and confirmed the reliability of SSP. After this initial migration, TARGET2 already settled around 50% of overall traffic in terms of volume and 30% in terms of value.

On 18 February 2008, the second migration successfully migrated to TARGET2, comprising Belgium, Finland, France, Ireland, the Netherlands, Portugal and Spain.

On 19 May 2008, the final group migrated to TARGET2, comprising Denmark, Estonia, Greece, Italy, Poland and the ECB. The six-month migration process went smoothly and did not cause any operational disruptions.

Slovakia joined TARGET2 on 1 January 2009, Bulgaria joined in February 2010, Romania on 4 July 2011, and Croatia in February 2016.

== Participation ==
The use of TARGET2 was mandatory for the settlement of any euro operations involving the Eurosystem, consisting of the European Central Bank (ECB) and the national central banks of the 20 European Union member states that were part of the Eurozone by the end of the TARGET2 period. Participation in TARGET2 was mandatory for new member states joining the Eurozone.

TARGET2 services in euro were available to non-Eurozone states. National central banks of states which have not yet adopted the euro could also participate in TARGET2 to facilitate the settlement of transactions in euro. Central banks from four non-Eurozone states Bulgaria, Denmark, Poland and Romania also participated in TARGET2.

In 2012, TARGET2 had 999 direct participants, 3,386 indirect participants and 13,313 correspondents.

== Activity ==
There was no upper or lower limit on the value of payments. TARGET2 had to be used for all payments involving the Eurosystem, as well as for the settlement of operations of all large-value net settlement systems and securities settlement systems handling the euro. TARGET2 was operated on a single technical platform. The business relationships were established between the TARGET2 users and their national central bank. In terms of the value processed, TARGET2 was one of the largest payment systems in the world.

=== Statistics ===
In 2012, TARGET2:

- settled the cash positions of 82 ancillary systems,
- processed a daily average of 354,185 payments, representing a daily average value of €2,477 billion,
- the average value of a TARGET2 transaction was €7.1 million,
- two-thirds of all TARGET2 payments (i.e., 68%) had a value of less than €50,000 each; 11% of all payments had value of over €1 million each,
- the peak in volume turnover was 29 June 2012 with 536,524 transactions and peak value turnover was on 1 March 2012 with €3,718 billion,
- TARGET2's share in total large-value payment system traffic in euro was 92% in value terms and 58% in volume terms,
- the SSP technical availability was 100%, and
- 99.85% of TARGET2 payments were processed in less than two minutes.

=== Pricing ===
There were two pricing schemes:

- Recurring fixed charges and a fixed transaction fee:
  - Monthly fixed charge: €100.00
  - Single transaction price: €0.80
- Recurring fixed charge and a variable transaction fee based on number of transactions:
  - Monthly fixed charge: €1,250.00
  - Variable transaction price: volume-based between €0.125 and €0.60

=== Holidays ===
The TARGET2 system was closed on Saturdays and Sundays and on the following public holidays in all participating countries: 1 January, Good Friday and Easter Monday (according to the calendar used by Western Christianity), 1 May, 25 December and 26 December.

=== Operations ===
==== Outages ====
In October 2020, the system and TARGET2 Securities experienced an almost-11-hour outage, attributed to a "software glitch in a third-party network device" by the ECB, per a report. Much shorter service interruptions of different sorts have hit Target2 in July 2019, November 2018 and December 2017, and in October 2020 Euronext NV, a stock market on the continent, also experienced some outages, per the report.

=== Intra-system balances ===
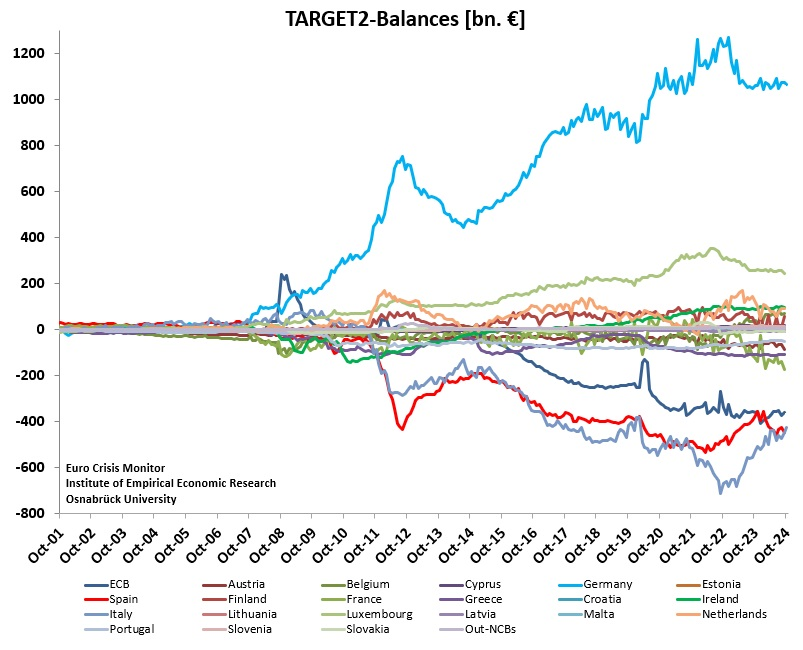
TARGET2 balances of selected countries of Euro system starting 2001

Starting during the 2008 financial crisis and the euro area crisis, the main subjects of criticism were the unlimited financial balances made available since the establishment of the TARGET system by the national central banks of the Eurosystem on the one hand and by the ECB on the other.

The issue of the increasing TARGET balances was brought to public attention for the first time in early 2011 by Hans-Werner Sinn, president of the Munich-based Ifo Institute for Economic Research. In an article in Wirtschaftswoche, he drew attention to the enormous increase in TARGET claims held by Germany's Bundesbank, from €5 billion at the end of 2006 to €326 billion at the end of 2010, and to the attendant liability risk. In the German daily Süddeutsche Zeitung he put the entire volume of the TARGET liabilities of Greece, Ireland, Portugal, and Spain at €340 billion at the end of February 2011. Moreover, he pointed out that if these countries should exit the Eurozone and declare insolvency, Germany's liability risk would amount to 33% of that sum, or €114 billion, relating these sums to the other rescue facilities of euro countries and the International Monetary Fund. Before he made them public, TARGET deficits or surpluses were not the subject of major public attention even though they were disclosed by Eurosystem central banks.

Shortly thereafter, Sinn interpreted the TARGET balances for the first time within the context of current account deficits, international private capital movements and the international shifting of the refinancing credit that the national central banks of the Eurosystem grant to the commercial banks in their jurisdiction. He proved that the ECB system compensated the interruption and reversal in capital flows triggered by the 2008 financial crisis by shifting refinancing credit among national central banks. The increase in TARGET liabilities is a direct measure of net payment orders across borders, i.e. of the portion of the current account deficit that is not counterbalanced by capital imports, or, equivalently, the sum of the current account deficit and net capital exports. Indirectly, they also measure a country's amount of central bank money created and lent out beyond what is needed for domestic circulation. Since every country needs a relatively steady amount of central bank money for its domestic transactions, payment orders to other countries, which reduce the domestic stock of money, must be offset by a continuous issuing of new refinancing credit, i.e., the creation of new central bank money. Similarly, the increase in money balances in the country whose central bank honours the payment orders reduces the demand for fresh refinancing credit. Hence, a country's TARGET liabilities also indicate the extent to which its central bank has replaced the capital markets to finance its current account deficit, as well as any possible capital flight, by creating new central bank money through corresponding refinancing credit. Sinn illustrated that from an economic perspective, TARGET credit and formal rescue facilities serve the same purpose and involve similar liability risks. Sinn's presentation on 19 May 2011 at the Munich Economic Summit motivated an op-ed column in the Financial Times. They reconstructed the data on the basis of the balance sheets of the Eurosystem's national central banks and the balance-sheet statistics of the International Monetary Fund.

Later, in June 2011, Hans-Werner Sinn and Timo Wollmershaeuser compiled the first panel database of the Eurozone's TARGET balances. The authors point out that the additional creation of money by the central banks of the crisis-stricken countries was provided by a lowering of the standards for the collateral that commercial banks have to provide to their national central banks to obtain refinancing credit. Furthermore, they showed that the commercial banks of the Eurozone's core countries used the incoming liquidity to reduce the refinancing credit they drew from their national central bank, even lending the surplus liquidity to this central bank, which implies that the TARGET balances indirectly also measure the reallocation of refinancing credit among the countries of the Eurozone. The authors showed that the national central banks of the northern countries became net debtors to their own banking systems. Sinn and Wollmershaeuser argue that the euro crisis is a balance-of-payments crisis, which in its substance is similar to the Bretton Woods crisis. Moreover, they show the extent to which TARGET credit financed current account deficits or capital flight in Greece, Ireland, Portugal, Spain and Italy. They also show that the current account deficits of Greece and Portugal were financed for years by refinancing credits of their national central banks and the concomitant TARGET credit. They also document the Irish capital flight and the capital flight from Spain and Italy, which began in earnest in summer 2011. Following Sinn, the authors compare the TARGET balances of the Eurosystem with the corresponding balances in the US settlement system (Interdistrict Settlement Account) and point out that US balances relative to US GDP have decreased thanks to a regularly performed settlement procedure in which ownership shares in a common Fed clearing portfolio are reallocated among the various district Feds comprising the US Federal Reserve System. They advocate the establishment of a similar system in Europe to end the ECB's role as a provider of international public credit that undercuts private market conditions.

Hans-Werner Sinn addressed the TARGET balances issue again in a special edition of ifo Schnelldienst and made it the main topic of his book Die Target-Falle ("The Target Trap"), published in early October 2012.

A number of economists took a stand on the issue of the TARGET balances in a publication of the Ifo Institute, confirming Sinn's analysis. Financial commentator David Marsh, writing in early 2012, noted that TARGET2 provides "automatic central bank funding for EMU countries suffering capital outflows provided through it" and that the balances would "have to be shared out by central banks throughout the Eurosystem ... if EMU fragments into its constituent parts. So the pressure on Germany is to keep the balances growing, in order to avoid crystallization of losses that would be hugely damaging not just to Berlin but also to central banks and governments in Paris and Rome".

The official reactions to Sinn's research findings were mixed. At first, in February and March 2011, the Bundesbank downplayed the TARGET balances as an irrelevant statistical position. However, in early 2012, Bundesbank chief Jens Weidmann wrote a letter to ECB head Mario Draghi on the subject which "found its way into the columns of the conservative Frankfurter Allgemeine Zeitung newspaper. It appeared to suggest more secure collateralisation for the overall ECB credits to weaker EMU central banks, which now amount to more than €800 billion under the ECB's TARGET2 electronic payment system," Marsh noted in a subsequent column.

Jens Ulbrich and Alexander Lipponer (economists at the Bundesbank) justified the policy of the ECB during the European balance-of-payments crisis as follows: In the crisis, the Eurosystem consciously assumed a larger intermediation function in view of the massive disruptions in the interbank market by extending its liquidity control instruments. With this greater role in the provision of central bank money – essentially by changing to a full allotment procedure in refinancing operations and the extension of longer-term refinancing operations – the total volume of refinancing credits provided has increased (temporarily even markedly). At the same time, the quality requirements for the underlying collateral were reduced in the crisis. The higher risk was accepted to maintain the functioning of the financial system under more difficult conditions.

The Ifo Institute's regularly updated "Exposure level indicator" ('Haftungspegel') shows Germany's potential financial burden should the crisis-stricken euro countries exit the currency union and declare insolvency. In another development, the Institute of Empirical Economic Research at the University of Osnabrueck collects and publishes TARGET2 data from all euro countries on the basis of the balance sheets of each central bank.

Nevertheless, there are also some economists who contradict some points of Sinn's analysis. Paul De Grauwe and Yuemei Ji argue that Germany's and other countries' TARGET claims could be made void, without suffering any losses, since the value of the central bank money, being "fiat money", is independent of a central bank's assets. Sinn, in his rejoinder, showed that the TARGET balances represent the shift of refinancing credit to the crisis-stricken countries, representing thus the claim on the interest returns from these countries. Eliminating the TARGET balances would thus entail a real loss of resources amounting to the present value of this interest income, which is reflected exactly by the amount of TARGET claims. This loss would result in a smaller transfer of Bundesbank's revenues to the German budget and, should the situation arise, in the necessity to recapitalise the Bundesbank through increased taxation. Sinn uses the same reasoning in his book Die Target-Falle. Sinn points out that the option of self-rescue for the crisis-affected countries by drawing TARGET credit forces Germany to approve the formal rescue facilities and eventually to accept eurobonds as well. He considers the resulting path dependence in policy-making a "trap". Analysis of TARGET2 balances countering the Ifo conclusions have been advanced by economist Karl Whelan at University College Dublin. In summer 2012, Thomas A. Lubik, a senior economist and research advisor, and Karl Rhodes, a writer, both at the Federal Reserve Bank of Richmond (Virginia, US), cited Whelan's work and also drew parallels and distinctions between the US Fed and the ECB in analysing the balances. Lubik and Rhodes argued that:

"TARGET2 merely reflects persistent imbalances in current accounts and capital accounts. It does not cause them ... [and does not represent] a 'stealth bailout' of the periphery nations".

Sinn countered that he was misinterpreted in this point insofar as he was just "saying that the current-account deficits were sustained with the extra refinancing credit behind the TARGET balances" and this would "not equate to claiming that current-account deficits and TARGET deficits were positively correlated".

Alexander L. Wolman believes that rising Interdistrict Settlement Account (ISA) balances – the US-equivalent of rising TARGET balances, if there were no yearly rebalancing – would not be a reason for concern in the US, because the borderlines of the Federal Reserve Districts do not follow national, not even state borders. Further, a rising ISA balance of the Federal Reserve District of New York would be regarded as not surprising, as New York is the financial center of the United States. Until 1975 there was no rebalancing between Federal Reserve districts, a fact which did not lead to major discussions.

Finally, in late 2016, after some years of relative improvement but with rising worries over Italy, the level of TARGET2 intra-eurozone balances at the ECB had surpassed 2012's record levels. The claims represented half of the Germany's net foreign assets and were on track shortly to reach €1 trillion if trends continued unchecked.

== See also ==
- TARGET2 Securities
- SWIFT
- Fedwire
- European Central Bank
- FedNow
