= Universal Payment Identification Code =

Identifier for a bank account in the United States

A Universal Payment Identification Code (UPIC) is an identifier (or banking address) for a bank account in the United States used to receive electronic credit payments. A UPIC acts exactly like a US bank account number and protects sensitive banking information. The actual bank account number, including the bank's ABA routing transit number, are masked by the UPIC. Only credit transactions to an account can be initiated with a UPIC. All direct debits are blocked, which should mitigate unauthorized transactions to an account.

Other benefits of UPICs include:

- UPICs mask confidential banking information, reducing the risk of fraud while facilitating secure electronic payments.
- UPICs are restricted to credit payments, preventing unauthorized debits.
- UPICs remain with the customer regardless of banking relationships, making any change of bank or account transparent to trading partners.
- UPICs point to a single bank account. However, one account can have several UPICs

Concerns with UPIC include:

- UPICs only work for NACHA's Automated Clearing House (ACH) credit transactions. Fedwire credits cannot use UPICs.
- A bank must use the Electronic Payments Network for ACH processing to issue UPICs.
