= Systemically Important Payment System =

Designation for financial payment systems

A Systemically Important Payment System (SIPS) is a payment systems whose failure could potentially endanger the operation of the whole economy. In general, these are the major payment clearing systems or real-time gross settlement systems of individual countries, but in the case of Europe, there are certain pan-European payment systems. As of late 2023, the European Central Bank had designated five payment systems as SIPS, namely T2, EURO1, STEP2, CORE(FR), and Mastercard Europe.

In the event of a bank failure, adherence to the rules for the operation of SIPS should prevent a domino effect whereby payment obligations of the failing bank are effected against the solvent banks. Clearly, this does not prevent the effects of a bank failure from spreading; however, it closes off one route.

== Operation of a SIPS ==
In 2001, the Bank for International Settlements (BIS) issued the "Core Principles for Systemically Important Payment Systems", and these are summarised below. In certain banking circles, these have become known as the 10 Commandments.

In 2003 the European Central Bank (ECB) further elaborated on how the principles should be applied in Euro retail payment systems.

Subsequently, in response to perceived increased risks of terrorist attacks, the ECB in 2006 published detailed oversight expectations for business continuity planning, greatly expanding on core principle number 7.

BIS added an additional recommendation in relation to countries which use cheques. It urged the operators of cheque clearing to have special regard to the fact that cheques may be dishonoured and returned some days after presentation, and this poses special risks. This is particularly relevant to countries such as Britain, Ireland, France, and US and should be regarded as the 11th commandment of payments.

BIS CPSS is currently preparing for the new global standards for not only payment systems but also securities settlement systems, central counterparties and trade repositories. The new standards (Principles for FMI) is now under market consultation and are going to be published in 2012.

== Core principles ==
A systemically important payment system (SIPS) should have:

1. A well-founded legal basis
2. Rules and procedures which enable participants to have a clear understanding of the system’s impact on each of the financial risks they incur through participation in it.
3. Clearly defined procedures for the management of credit risks and liquidity risks, which specify the respective responsibilities of the system operator and the participants and which provide appropriate incentives to manage and contain those risks
4. Prompt final settlement on the day of value, preferably during the day and at a minimum at the end of the day.
5. Where multilateral netting takes place, it should, at a minimum be capable of ensuring the timely completion of daily settlements in the event of an inability to settle by the participant with the largest single settlement obligation
6. Assets used for settlement should preferably be a claim on the central bank; where other assets are used, they should carry little or no credit risk and little or no liquidity risk
7. A high degree of security and operational reliability, and contingency arrangements for timely completion of daily processing
8. Practical for its users and efficient for the economy
9. Objective and publicly disclosed criteria for participation, which permit fair and open access
10. Governance arrangements which are effective, accountable and transparent

== See also ==
- Financial market infrastructure
- Systemic risk
- Systemically important financial market utility
- Systemically important financial institution
