= E-commerce payment system =

System that facilitates e-commerce transactions

An e-commerce payment system (or an electronic payment system) is a digital platform that facilitates transactions involving the purchase and sale of goods and services between consumers and merchants. These systems allow customers to make transactions through their devices, helping to connect buyers and sellers and support market development. The choice of payment system depends on factors such as the type of product or service being sold, the retailer's budget, and the level of development of the target market. Common e-commerce payment methods include electronic wallets (e-wallets), credit and debit cards, bank transfers, buy now, pay later (BNPL) services, mobile payments, cash on delivery, and cryptocurrencies.

Credit cards remain the most common form of payment for e-commerce transactions. As of 2008, in North America, almost 90% of online retail transactions were made with this payment type. It is difficult for an online retailer to operate without supporting credit and debit cards due to their widespread use. Online merchants must comply with stringent rules stipulated by the credit and debit card issuers (e.g. Visa and Mastercard) in accordance with a bank and financial regulation in the countries where the debit/credit service conducts business.

E-commerce payment system often use B2B mode. The security of customer information, business information, and payment information base is a concern during the payment process of transactions under the conventional B2B e-commerce model.

For the vast majority of payment systems accessible on the public Internet, baseline authentication (of the financial institution on the receiving end), data integrity, and confidentiality of the electronic information exchanged over the public network involves obtaining a certificate from an authorized certificate authority (CA) who provides public-key infrastructure (PKI). Even with transport layer security (TLS) in place to safeguard the portion of the transaction conducted over public networks especially with payment systems the customer-facing website itself must be coded with great care, so as not to leak credentials and expose customers to subsequent identity theft.

Despite widespread use in North America, there are still many countries such as China and India that have some problems to overcome in regard to credit card security. Increased security measures include the use of the card verification number (CVN) which detects fraud by comparing the verification number printed on the signature strip on the back of the card with the information on file with the cardholder's issuing bank.

There are companies that specialize in financial transactions over the Internet, such as Stripe for credit card processing, Smartpay for direct online bank payments and PayPal for alternative payment methods at checkout. Many of the mediaries permit consumers to establish an account quickly, and to transfer funds between their on-line accounts and traditional bank accounts, typically via automated clearing house (ACH) transactions.

The speed and simplicity with which cyber-mediary accounts can be established and used have contributed to their widespread use, despite the risk of theft, abuse, and the typically arduous process of seeking recourse when things go wrong. The inherent information asymmetry of large financial institutions maintaining information safeguards provides the end-user with little insight into the system when the system mishandles funds, leaving disgruntled users frequently accusing the mediaries of sloppy or wrongful behavior; trust between the public and the banking corporations is not improved when large financial institutions are revealed to have taken flagrant advantage of their asymmetric power, such as the 2016 Wells Fargo account fraud scandal.

== Methods of online payment ==
There are varied types of electronic payment methods such as online credit card transactions, e-wallets, e-cash and wireless payment system. Credit cards constitute a popular method of online payment but can be expensive for the merchant to accept because of transaction fees primarily. Debit cards constitute an excellent alternative with similar security but usually much cheaper charges. Besides card-based payments, alternative payment methods have emerged and sometimes even claimed market leadership.

=== Credit cards ===
Credit cards are widely used for online payments. Initially, relatively few adaptations were made to credit cards for online transactions, apart from the introduction of additional security codes. However, newer security features have been introduced to protect transactions. A major difference between online and offline payments is that, in online purchases, the physical card is not presented to the merchant, nor does the merchant obtain a signed or equivalent confirmation from the customer. Furthermore, not all online transactions are authorized, particularly those involving small businesses, whereas offline transactions generally require authorization. Authentication and verification technologies have increased the accuracy of transaction authorization. The credit card system has a long-established network of users and merchants, ensuring its widespread applicability and a large user base for transactions of various kinds. However, credit card transaction fees for small payments are relatively high, making credit cards less suitable for micropayments.

=== Bank payments ===
This is a system that does not involve any sort of physical card. It is used by customers who have accounts enabled with Internet banking. Instead of entering card details on the purchaser's site, in this system the payment gateway allows one to specify which bank they wish to pay from. Then the user is redirected to the bank's website, where one can authenticate oneself and then approve the payment. Typically there will also be some form of two-factor authentication.

It is typically seen as being safer than using credit cards, as it is much more difficult for hackers to gain login credentials compared to credit card numbers. For many eCommerce merchants, offering an option for customers to pay with the cash in their bank account reduces cart abandonment as it enables a way to complete a transaction without credit cards.

=== Mobile money wallets ===
In some developing countries, many people do not have access to banking facilities, especially in tier II and tier III cities. Taking the example of Bangladesh, there are more mobile phone users than there are people with active bank accounts. Telecom operators, in such locations, have started offering mobile money wallets which allow adding funds easily through their existing mobile subscription number, by visiting physical recharge points close to their homes and offices and converting their cash into mobile wallet currency. This can be used for online transaction and eCommerce purchases.

A similar development has occurred in China, where mobile payment systems such as Alipay and WeChat Pay have become widely used. Alipay, with over one billion users, facilitates transactions through its simplicity and efficiency. However, mobile payment services also present security risks, particularly concerning data transmission and the protection of users' personal information. A study noted that password protection is less important when mobile phones are used solely as communication devices. However, when used for payments, the loss of a mobile phone or the decryption of its password can result in significant financial losses to the user.

== See also ==
- Electronic funds transfer
- Payments as a service
- Payment service provider
- Online Banking ePayments
