= STET-CORE =

Financial infrastructure

The STET-CORE system is a French interbank automated clearing house. STET SA, whose name refers to Systèmes Technologiques d'Echange et de Traitement (lit. 'Exchange and Processing Technological Systems'), is the system's operating company, based in Paris La Défense. CORE, whose name refers to COmpensation REtail (compensation being French for clearing), is the main platform developed by STET SA.

The CORE platform supports the CORE(FR) clearing service for French banks, which in 2014 has been designated as a Systemically Important Payment System at the European level. CORE also supports other systems such as CEC (Centre for Exchange and Clearing, French: Centre d'Échange et de Compensation) in Belgium. CORE is one of the largest European retail payment system by volume and value. STET has also developed a pan-European platform for instant payments named SEPA.EU.

== Overview ==
STET was established in December 2004 by France's six main banks, namely BNP Paribas, Crédit Agricole, Crédit Mutuel, Groupe Caisse d'Épargne, Groupe Banque Populaire, and Société Générale, to replace a previous system known as the Système interbancaire de télécompensation (SIT). The initiative was intended as a French banking industry response to the creation of the Single Euro Payments Area (SEPA). The retail payments operated by STET, named CORE(FR), replaced SIT which ceased operations in October 2008.

CORE clears payments from retail instruments such as wire transfers, promissory notes, direct debits, documentary collections, checks, or card payments, and allows for the exchange of SEPA Credit Transfers (SCTs) in France and across the EU. CORE started operations in January 2008 and eventually replaced the SIT in mid-2008.

In March 2013, the CEC, which operated as interbank clearing house in Belgium, in turn completed its migration to the STET platform. The Belgian and French clearing services members are still treated differentially, however.

In December 2015, STET merged with SER2S, the manager of real-time payment instructions for the French CB payment cards consortium, and converted itself into a French joint-stock company, STET SA. By end-2016, the Bank of France, Caisse des Dépôts et Consignations, Crédit Mutuel Arkéa and HSBC France had joined the shareholder banks as direct participants in CORE(FR), and the system had 177 indirect participants.

CORE migrated its SEPA Direct Debits (SDDs) on 21 November 2016 to the pan-European platform SEPA.EU, and its SCTs in 2018. SEPA.EU allows for instant payments, activated on 2 November 2017, as well as the management of APIs in line with the second Payment Services Directive. As described in 2016, its competitors in Europe included RT1 (by EBA Clearing), equensWorldline (by Worldline), and Nets.

== See also ==
- Electronic funds transfer
- TIPANET
- HiPay
