= Auto-collateralisation =

Auto-collateralisation is a credit operation that is or can be triggered, when a buyer does not have sufficient funds to settle a securities transaction, in order to improve its cash position for the next settlement cycle. The credit provided can be secured using securities already held by the buyer (“collateral stocks”) or the securities that are being purchased (“collateral flows”).

== Types of auto-collateralisation ==
In TARGET2-Securities, auto-collateralisation may be based either on collateral on flow or collateral on stock. The European Central Bank describes collateral on flow as the use of the securities being purchased in the same settlement transaction, while collateral on stock refers to securities already held by the buyer and earmarked for auto-collateralisation.

This distinction is important to the operation of the mechanism, since both forms are used to generate intraday liquidity for securities settlement when the dedicated cash account holder does not have sufficient funds available at the moment of settlement.

== See also ==
- T2S
