= The Clearing House Payments Company =

US banking and payments company

The Clearing House Payments Company L.L.C.
- Founded: 1853; 173 years ago
- Area served: United States
- Products: Core payments system infrastructure
- Website: www.theclearinghouse.org

The Clearing House Payments Company L.L.C. (PayCo) is a U.S.-based limited liability company formed by Clearing House Association. PayCo is a private sector, payment system infrastructure that operates an electronic check clearing and settlement system (SVPCO), a clearing house, and a wholesale funds transfer system (CHIPS).

== Governance ==
Clearing House Association and The Clearing House Payments Company LLC conduct business under the name The Clearing House. The Clearing House is the oldest banking association and payments company in the United States.

The Clearing House governance model includes a supervisory board and two managing boards, one for the Payments Company and one for the Association. The businesses and affairs of PayCo and the Association are managed by the Supervisory Board. The managing boards of PayCo and the Association have responsibility for the oversight of their respective businesses and financial performance and for the establishment of their agendas.

== Member banks ==
- Banco Santander
- Bank of America
- Barclays Bank
- The Bank of New York Mellon
- BB&T
- Capital One
- Citibank
- Citizens Financial Group
- Comerica
- Deutsche Bank
- HSBC
- JPMorgan Chase
- KeyBank
- MUFG Union Bank
- PNC Financial Services
- Regions Financial Corporation
- UBS
- U.S. Bancorp
- Wells Fargo

=== Payments Company shared board seat ===
- City National
- Fifth Third Bank
- First Citizens
- M&T

== PayCo services ==
=== Clearing House Interbank Payments System ===
The Clearing House Interbank Payments System (CHIPS) is a bank owned automated funds-transfer system for domestic and international high value payment transactions in U.S. dollars. It is a real-time final settlement payment system that continuously matches, off-sets and settles payments among international and domestic banks.

CHIPS provides real-time, immediate and final settlement of payment messages continuously throughout the day similar to Fedwire. During the business day, system participants can send their payments to CHIPS. Funds are released by available funds on hand (no overdrafts are permitted) or through offsetting. A “balance release algorithm” continuously searches the queue of unreleased payments and uses this patented off-setting algorithm to match and release payments.

CHIPS’ ability to perform real-time bilateral and multi-lateral off-setting means that very large payments can be released earlier in the day, and that participants realize greater liquidity efficiency savings than those possible in pure RTGS systems. With real-time off-setting, the system continuously offsets payments between two or more CHIPS participants. A payment is considered final and irrevocable at the instant CHIPS releases it.

Since CHIPS’ inception The Clearing House management has implemented a number of credit, systemic and liquidity risk reduction measures to better manage individual participant risk, eliminate daylight overdraft exposure, and virtually eliminate systemic risk.

CHIPS provides financial institutions an alternative to the Federal Reserve's Fedwire service.

=== Electronic Payments Network ===
Electronic Payments Network (EPN) is an automated clearing house (ACH), i.e. a computerized, batch-processing funds-transfer system that processes domestic consumer and commercial financial transactions among depository institutions. Rather than sending each payment separately, ACH transactions are accumulated and sorted by destination for transmission during a predetermined time period.

The Automated Clearing Exchange System (ACES) is the core computerized system for EPN processing of payments between account holders at depository financial institutions. EPN serves approximately 450 processing customers. EPN participants include Depository Financial Institutions (DFI) throughout the United States and its territories as part of a nationwide network for domestic commercial banks, thrifts, credit unions and agencies of foreign institutions.

EPN provides financial institutions an alternative to the Federal Reserve's FedACH service.

=== Real Time Payments ===
The Clearing House Payments Company operates the RTP (Real Time Payments) service which facilitates instant payments for customers of financial institutions who implement RTP. The service is available to all federally-insured depository institutions the US. As of 2023, approximately 300 financial institutions subscribe to the service. Six years after RTP's introduction in 2017, the Federal Reserve began offering the competing FedNow service.

=== SVPCO ===
SVPCO is The Clearing House's line of business that operates CHECCS, which is a computerized settlement system.

SVPCO Online Adjustments provides a secure online database to automate cash letter adjustments.

SVPCO Online Settlement is integrated with the SVPCO Image Payments Network and provides automated settlement for cash letter activity. It also works in tandem with SVPCO Online Adjustments, which allows institutions to reconcile adjustments the same day by eliminating the need for paper forms and attachments.

== Check exchanges ==
The New York Clearing House Association was organized at the Bank Officers meeting on October 4, 1853. There were fifty-seven banks in New York City in 1853. Fifty-two became members of the Association. The first check exchanges at The Clearing House were held on October 11, 1853. The Clearing House does not exchange physical checks any longer. The original check exchanges have evolved into a new computerized check settlement system operated by SVPCO called the Clearing House Electronic Check Clearing System (CHECCS).
