= Online Banking ePayments =

Online Banking ePayments (OBeP) is a type of payments network, developed by the banking industry in conjunction with technology providers. It is specifically designed to address the unique requirements of payments made via the Internet.

Key aspects of OBeP that distinguish it from other online payments systems are:

1. The consumer is authenticated in real-time by the consumer financial institution's online banking infrastructure.
2. The availability of funds is validated in real-time by the consumer's financial institution.
3. The consumer's financial institution provides guarantee of payment to the merchant.
4. Payment is made as a credit transfer (push payment) from the consumer's financial institution to the merchant, as opposed to a debit transfer (pull payment).
5. Payment is made directly from the consumer's account rather than through a third-party account.

Nearly half of the bills paid in the US during 2013 were done via electronic bill payment. Also, during 2014, nearly 48% of all online shopping in North America were made with a credit card. Globally, online payments are expected to exceed 3 trillion Euros (approx. US$3.2 trillion) in the next 5 years.

== Privacy and security features ==
OBeP systems protect consumer personal information by not requiring the disclosure of account numbers or other sensitive personal data to online merchants or other third parties. During the checkout process, the merchant redirects the consumer to their financial institution's online banking site where they login and authorize charges. After charges are authorized, the financial institution redirects the consumer back to the merchant site. All network communications are protected using industry standard encryption. Additionally, communications with the OBeP network take place on a virtual private network, not over the public Internet.

In order to be positive that your identity, information and other personal features are truly secure, the following cautions should be taken: Make sure a secure browser is being used. Read all privacy policies provided. Many individuals simply skip over such important information that could spell out potential risks. If a risk seems unnecessary and odd, it would be safer to skip this payment rather than take the risk with one's hard earned money. Keep all personal information private. If phone numbers, social security numbers or other private, important information is asked for one should be cautious. Banking information is important information as it is, asking for unnecessary personal information should be a red flag of suspicious behavior. Selecting businesses that are trustworthy is key. Most companies will email a customer with a transaction receipt upon payment. Keeping a record of these is important in order to have proof of purchase or payment. Lastly, checking bank statements regularly is crucial in keeping up-to-date with transactions.

== Costs ==
Costs associated with fraud, estimated at 1.2% of sales by online retailers in 2009, are reported to be dramatically reduced with OBeP, because the issuer bank is responsible for the authentication of the credit transaction and provides guaranteed funds to the merchant.

Because the merchant is not responsible for storing and protecting confidential consumer information, OBeP systems also reduce costs associated with mitigating fraud, fraud screening, and PCI audits.

Transaction fees on Online Banking ePayments vary by network, but are often fixed, and lower than the average 1.9% merchant fees associated with credit card transactions – especially for larger purchases.

== Other benefits ==
=== For consumers ===
- use of cash-like payment encourages responsible consumerism
- does not require set-up or registration with a third-party payments entity
- presents familiar interface to facilitate online payment
- awareness of funds availability

=== For merchants ===
- improved sales conversion / reduced abandoned carts
- real time authorization of guaranteed ACH payment (good funds)
- offering preferred payment methods may drive repeat transactions

=== For financial institutions ===
- recapture revenue being lost to alternative payment providers
- encourages consumers to move to online banking, replacing more costly branch and telephone alternatives

== Potential downfalls ==
The idea of online payments and transactions has led numerous individuals, corporations and groups to be hesitant. Sharing of personal information to such a vast entity, such as the internet, can lead to potential problems. Remaining cautious and careful with what information is shared and to whom it is shared with is key in remaining safe and secure when using ePayments.

- Identity theft is prevalent with online transactions
- No face-to-face interaction for help, questions, issues
- Website issues can hinder the ability to make payments in a timely manner
- Passwords - sometimes remembering a password can be difficult and with something as important as an ePayment website, it is crucial this information is not lost or forgotten

== Types and implementations ==
- Multi-Bank – requires that a merchant have a single connection to the OBeP network in order to accept payment from any participating financial institution.
- Mono-Bank – requires that a merchant have a separate connection to each participating financial institution.
- A third category, also known as “overlay payment solutions” provide a similar consumer experience to Online Banking ePayments, but violate a key tenet of the OBeP definition by requiring the consumer to share their online banking credentials with a third party.
- A fourth category requires that a merchant have a single connection to an alternative payment provider. This alternative payment provider has connections to multiple online banks. This does not require the consumer to share their online banking credentials, but still offers the same advantages to the merchants as “overlay payment solutions”.

== See also ==
- Automated Clearing House
- NACHA-The Electronic Payments Association
- E-commerce payment system
- Electronic funds transfer
- Electronic money
- PCI DSS
