= T2 (settlement system) =

European payments infrastructure

T2 is a financial market infrastructure that provides real-time gross settlement (RTGS) of payments, mostly in euros. It is operated by the European Central Bank and is the critical payments infrastructure of the euro area. With turnover in the trillions of euros every day, it is one of the largest payment systems in the world. It is one of three so-called TARGET Services, together with TARGET2-Securities (T2S) for securities and TARGET Instant Payment Settlement (TIPS) for fast payments. The acronym TARGET stands for Trans-European Automated Real-time Gross-Settlement Express Transfer.

T2 replaced its predecessor RTGS system, TARGET2 (itself introduced in 2007-2008), on 20 March 2023.

== Overview ==
Like other RTGS systems, T2 allows individual banks to submit payment orders and have them settled in central bank money, namely the euro. T2 settles payments between banks as well as those related to the Eurosystem's own operations. Member banks can connect to T2 either via SWIFT or via NEXI-Colt, a service of Nexi. In legal terms, the relationship is between the member bank and the relevant National Central Bank within the Eurosystem.

In addition to payments in euros, T2 allows settlements in other currencies of the EU if the respective central bank opts for it. This is a new feature of T2 compared with TARGET2, as is the adoption of the ISO 20022 messaging standard. T2 also integrates a Central Liquidity Management (CLM) functionality which extends to T2S and TIPS. The transition to T2 also entailed the phasing out of national settlement systems that had been kept e.g. for overnight deposit and intraday credit provision.

T2 was developed jointly with T2S by four central banks of the Eurosystem: the Bank of France, Bank of Italy, Bank of Spain, and Deutsche Bundesbank. It is planned to be complemented by a new Eurosystem Collateral Management System (ECMS), which will be the single collateral management system for collateralising the Eurosystem's monetary policy operations.

Like its predecessors TARGET and TARGET2, T2 is used for the end-of-day settlement of EURO1 (operated by the Euro Banking Association) and payments in euros between CLS Bank and its members.

On 21 March 2024, the Eurosystem and Danmarks Nationalbank signed an agreement that provides for Denmark to join T2 (as well as TIPS) in March 2025, allowing for T2 to settle transactions in Danish krones as well as euros.

== Statistics ==
In the course of 2023, TARGET2 (until 20 March) and T2 (after that date) settled 104 million transactions for a total turnover of €559 trillion, with daily turnover fluctuating between €1.4 trillion (29 May) and €4.7 trillion (20 March). That places TARGET2/T2 turnover below CLS and Fedwire but above BOJ-NET (Japan) and CHAPS (United Kingdom), as has been the case throughout the previous decade. The system suffered no outages during 2023; 90 percent of transactions were settled within 38 seconds, whereas 0.09 percent took more than five minutes.

As of end-2023, T2 had 956 direct participants holding an RTGS account, opening access to T2 settlement to 5,368 correspondents worldwide. In total, T2 was accessible to nearly 40,000 participants, including branches and subsidiaries of direct participants and correspondents.

== See also ==
- Fedwire
