= Darragh Buckley =

Irish-American entrepreneur

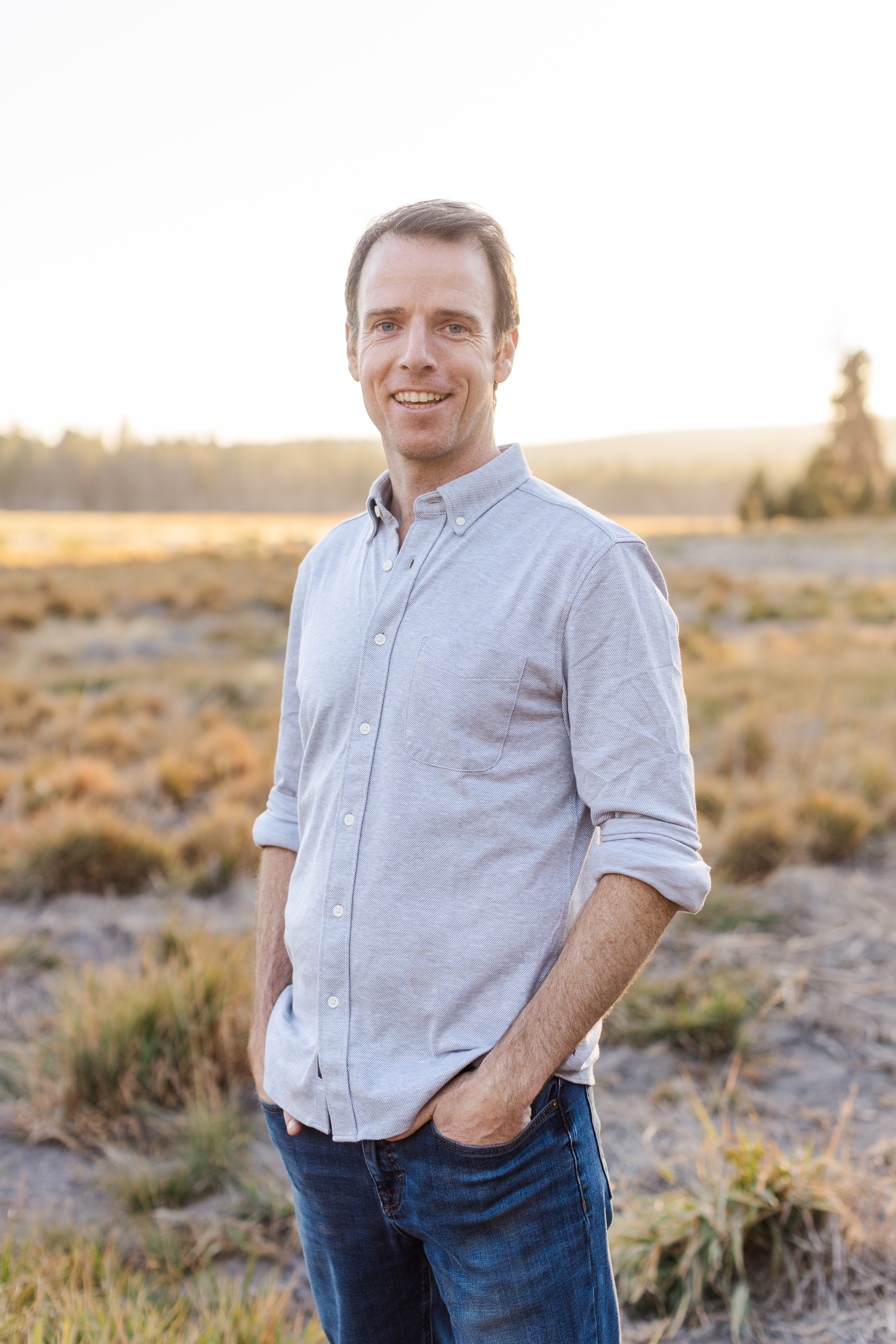
- Born: Limerick, Ireland
- Education: Massachusetts Institute of Technology (BS); University of Michigan (MS)
- Occupations: Entrepreneur, software engineer
- Known for: Founder of Increase;
- Title: CEO of Increase

Darragh Buckley is an Irish-American entrepreneur, software engineer, and founder and chief executive officer of Increase, a financial technology company.

== Biography ==
Buckley is a native of Limerick, Ireland. He holds a Bachelor of Science degree from Massachusetts Institute of Technology (MIT) and a Master of Science degree from the University of Michigan.

Before entering the fintech sector, Buckley worked at Lehman Brothers.

In 2010, Buckley joined Stripe as its first employee. Over the next six years, he was responsible for negotiating, implementing, and scaling Stripe's agreement with its primary bank partner, Wells Fargo, as well as building and scaling the company's programmatic controls for deposit account structures, money movement, regulation, cybersecurity, and privacy. He left Stripe in 2016.

Buckley founded Increase in 2020. The company enables financial services to be delivered programmatically, covering functions such as automated clearinghouse (ACH) transactions, wire transfers, and real-time payments. Its platform also functions as a core banking system, enabling clients to manage accounts, ledgers, and transaction processing through application programming interfaces (APIs). Increase has partnered with FDIC-insured banks, including Grasshopper Bank and First Internet Bank of Indiana, to provide regulated financial services.

Increase was named to the Forbes Fintech 50 list in 2025 and 2026.

Additionally, Buckley previously served as a member of the board of directors of Washington Business Bank. The bank was acquired by Sound Credit Union in June 2025: In mid-2025, Buckley acquired a controlling stake exceeding 10 percent in Twin City Bank, a community bank in Longview, Washington.
