= TARGET Services =

Payment services of the Eurosystem

TARGET Services (for Transeuropean Automated Real-time Gross-settlement Express Transfer) are payment services operated by the Eurosystem for the euro area and beyond on its proprietary financial market infrastructures.

As of late 2024, TARGET Services included T2 for large payments (which replaced TARGET2 in 2023), TARGET2-Securities (T2S) for securities transactions, and TARGET Instant Payment Settlement (TIPS) for instant payments. A fourth service, the Eurosystem Collateral Management System (ECMS), is to complement the TARGET suite in mid-June 2025.

== History ==
In 1993, as the Maastricht Treaty entered into force, central banks of the EU agreed that all of them should have an real-time gross settlement (RTGS) system, as some had already done in the previous decade. In 1995, they decided to interlink these national infrastructures through a pan-European system that they called TARGET. That original TARGET system duly began operations on 4 January 1999. Its first version had a decentralized structure that consisted of the national RTGS systems of the 12 euro area member states plus those of Denmark (KRONOS), Sweden (E-RIX), and the UK (CHAPS) together with the ECB Payment Mechanism (EPM). On 7 March 2005, Poland was the first new EU member state following the 2004 enlargement to connect to TARGET, via its SORBNET-EURO RTGS system operated by the National Bank of Poland.

The first TARGET was replaced with TARGET2, a more centralized system based on a Single Shared Platform (SSP), in stages from November 2007 to May 2008. In addition to euro area countries and those that would adopt the euro in subsequent years (namely Cyprus, Malta, Slovakia and the Baltic countries), Denmark and Poland participated in the migration to TARGET2, whereas Sweden and the UK did not. On 4 July 2011, Romania also connected to TARGET2.

In June 2015, TARGET2 participants were first allowed to open a Dedicated Cash Account (DCA) on the T2S platform, marking the start of the T2S service. In October 2018, T2S allowed settlements in Danish krones (DKK) in addition to those in euros.

TIPS was introduced in November 2018. On 19 February 2024, Sweden completed its integration into TIPS, allowing for TIPS to also settle instant payments in Swedish kronas.

TARGET2 was replaced with T2 in March 2023. T2 and TIPS will also allow settlements of DKK payments in March 2025.

In 2024, EU adopted Instant Payments Regulation. This legislation allowed non-bank financial institutions (for example, EMIs) to access central bank-operated payment systems, including TARGET. In order to do that, payment service providers (PSPs) need to meet the operational and technical requirements applicable to participants TARGET. This initiative allows non-bank PSPs to access services that previously were only available to traditional banks, like an option to safeguard users’ funds in an account held with a central bank.

== Legal structure ==
While technically integrated at the European level since the transition to TARGET2 in 2008, TARGET Services are based on contractual arrangements between participants and national entities known as TARGET components. The contractual conditions are harmonized in a formal Eurosystem document known as the TARGET Guideline last updated in 2022.

== Controversy ==
=== TARGET2 imbalances ===
During the euro area crisis of the 2010s, cross-country imbalances within the TARGET2 system became an object of heated discussion, particularly in Germany.

=== Outages ===
In October 2020, TARGET2 and T2S experienced an outage for nearly 11 hours.

On 27 February 2025, another outage disabled TARGET services for about seven hours. The ECB blamed a hardware defect, suggesting no malicious action. The ECB was criticized for the fact that its "system had a critical single point of failure".

== See also ==
- Fedwire
- CHAPS
- TARGET2
