= Common Electronic Fund Transfer Switch =

The Common Electronic Fund Transfer Switch (CEFTS) is a fully automated paperless fund transfer system which allows instantaneous fund transfers between member banks. CEFTS is a real-time interbank fund transferring method and it is a vital integral part of Sri Lanka's trusted national payment network, which is operated by LankaPay under the approval and guidance of the Central Bank of Sri Lanka. The CEFTS is supporting online real time fund transfers/payments between LankaPay-CEFTS members to enable bank customers to initiate transactions at any given point of time during a day and as well to make payments through ATMs, mobile phones, and internet even during non-banking hours in order to deliver uninterrupted services for the customers with a great convenience.

LankaPay has made rapid strides and mass transformation in facilitating electronic fund transfer services by introducing payment systems in Sri Lanka through the launch of the Common Electronic Fund Transfer Switch, a real-time bank transfer procedure for payments to be processed within seconds and electronic payments to be done by customers 24×7 and 365 days of the year. LankaPay introduced the CEFTS real-time fund transfer system switch is yet another move by LankaPay where customers can now carry out domestic interbank fund transfers up to LKR 5 million in real-time. Different member banks in Sri Lanka use Real-Time Fund Transfers and Instant Fund Transfers as similar terms for CEFTS.

The General Direction No 01 of 2018 as per the Monetary Board of the Central Bank of Sri Lanka under section 44 of the Payment and Settlement Systems Act No 28 of 2005 came into immediate effect as of 25 July 2018 implies to the operations of the Common Electronic Fund Transfer Switch, Lanka Clear (Pvt) Ltd and members of CEFTS. LankaPay CEFTS was initiated for the first time in Sri Lanka to accommodate fund transfers in online real time mode, so that the customers will benefit from the fund transfers rather than waiting for essential transfers.

In January 2016, Commercial Bank of Ceylon announced that for the first time in Sri Lanka's banking history that the users of the bank's online banking facility could make instant, real-time transfers of funds from their commercial bank accounts to accounts in other banks via LankaPay-CEFTS.

Maximum Customer Charges (LKR) as of 7 February 2025
| Internet Banking | Mobile Banking | ATM (Same Bank) | ATM (Other Banks) | Over the Counter |
|---|---|---|---|---|
| Rs.25 | Rs.25 | Rs.25 | Rs.100 | Rs.100 |
