= TARGET Instant Payment Settlement =

European payments infrastructure

TARGET Instant Payment Settlement or TIPS is a TARGET Service of the Eurosystem that allows the settlement of instant payments in central bank money. The acronym TARGET stands for Trans-European Automated Real-time Gross-Settlement Express Transfer; other TARGET Services include T2 (RTGS) and TARGET2-Securities.

TIPS was introduced in November 2018 to respond to developments in the electronic payments market. As of June 2026, it settled payments in euros, Swedish kronas and Danish krones, with extensions planned to Norwegian krones and Icelandic krónas.

== Overview ==
TIPS is an extension of T2 that complies with the SEPA Instant Credit Transfer (SCT Inst) scheme, a functionality of the Single Euro Payments Area (SEPA) initiative. Service providers that participate in T2 need to open a TIPS (T2) account to also participate in TIPS. SCI Inst compliance implies that transactions are finally settled in less than ten seconds. In 2024, TIPS settled 99% of transactions in less than five seconds.

Following an agreement between Sveriges Riksbank and the Eurosystem on 3 April 2020, the Swedish RTGS system RIX was connected to TIPS on 23 May 2022, and its integration into TIPS was completed on 19 February 2024. Another agreement with Danmarks Nationalbank on 21 March 2024 provided for Denmark to join TIPS and T2. Denmark migrated to TIPS in April 2025.

In October 2024, the European Central Bank announced intent to connect TIPS with other fast payment systems around the world, including via the Bank for International Settlements's Project Nexus and via a bilateral link with India's Unified Payments Interface.

In November 2024, Norges Bank signed an agreement to join TIPS and allow settlement of the Norwegian krone in 2028. In June 2026, the Central Bank of Iceland and the ECB signed an agreement for the Icelandic króna to join TIPS and allow settlement of payments in 2028. In September 2026 it was announced that Moldova will join TIPS.

== See also ==
- FedNow
- Faster Payments
