= Pan-European Automated Clearing House =

A pan-European automated clearing house (PE-ACH) is a clearing house that is able to settle SEPA compliant credit transfers and direct debits across the Eurozone.

At present there is only one PE-ACH in operation – STEP2 – which was established by the Euro Banking Association in April 2003. STEP2 reaches all corners of SEPA, processing over 22 Billion transactions per year (as of 2023). The Pan-European Clearing House plays an important role in connecting local clearing houses and minimising risks of fragmentation.

According to a survey done by Equens, in the future PE-ACH might be less relevant as banks will settle their transactions via multiple clearing houses rather than using one central clearing house.
