= Yupik =

Yupik may refer to:

- Yupik peoples, a group of Indigenous peoples of Alaska and the Russian Far East
- Yupik languages, a group of Eskaleut languages

Yupꞌik (with the apostrophe) may refer to:

- Yup'ik people, a Yupik people from western and southwestern Alaska
- Yup'ik language, their language
  - Yup'ik syllabary, a writing system formerly used for the language
