= Clearing House (EU) =

Clearing House is a working group in the European Union established after the September 11, 2001 attacks. It is composed of national security services under the Common Foreign and Security Policy who meet regularly in Brussels on counter-terrorism matters.

Its primary roles are to agree which groups go on the EU's black list of terrorist groups and have their financial assets in the EU frozen. It does not appear on official lists and is not open to public scrutiny. All advice given by the group is not accompanied by evidence or reasoning and when put before leaders it is adopted as an "A point" (agenda item without discussion).

There are some allegations that the group is open to political manipulation with calls for greater scrutiny, however this is resisted for security reasons.
