= William Hockey =

American engineer and entrepreneur

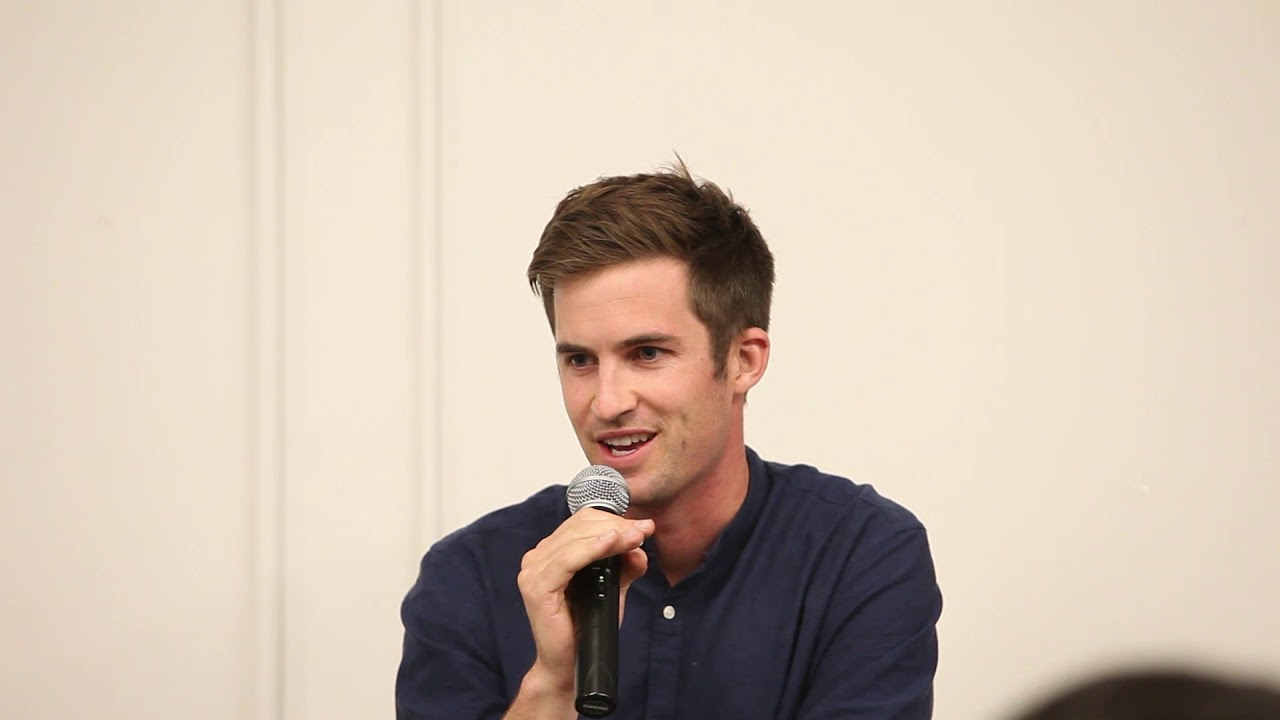
- Hockey in 2018
- Born: September 21, 1989 (age 36); San Luis Obispo, California, US
- Education: Emory University
- Known for: Column, Plaid

William Hockey (born 1989) is an American engineer and entrepreneur. He is best known for having started Column N.A, a nationally chartered regulated bank that operates as financial infrastructure for fintechs. He co-founded financial services company Plaid.

== Biography ==
Hockey was born in San Luis Obispo, California. He attended Emory University where he majored in computer science and economics. He spent a summer interning at Bain & Co. where he met his future co-founder Zachary Perret.

When he was 21, Hockey founded Plaid with Perret in New York City, initially focusing on consumer financial services. They moved into financial market infrastructure after being frustrated with the difficulty of building in financial services. After a year they moved to San Francisco after raising seed money from Spark Capital, NEA and Google Ventures. Plaid subsequently raised over $300 million additional investors including Goldman Sachs, Mary Meeker at KPCB, American Express, Visa and Mastercard.

Early in 2020, Visa agreed to buy Plaid for $5.3 billion, making Hockey the youngest individual to potentially sell a company for more than $5 billion. The United States Department of Justice Antitrust Division sued to block the deal, arguing that Visa was monopolist in online debit transactions, and that's proposed acquisition was an "insurance policy" to eliminate a threat to its core business. In 2021, the companies mutually decided to end the merger. A few months later, Plaid raised a $425 million Series D funding round, boosting its valuation to $13.4 billion. While Hockey has stepped down in his day-to-day role at Plaid, he remains on the board of directors.

In April 2022, Hockey launched Column, a nationally chartered bank that provides banking infrastructure for fintech developers. Column was built by acquiring and rebranding the community bank Northern California National Bank (later renamed Column National Association). The FDIC lists Column National Association as an FDIC-insured national bank with the Office of the Comptroller of the Currency as its primary federal regulator.
