= FedACH =

Automated clearing house by Federal Reserve Banks

- Product type: Automated clearing house service
- Current owner: Federal Reserve Banks
- Country: United States
- Introduced: 1972; 54 years ago
- Related brands: FedWire, FedNow
- Website: www.frbservices.org/financial-services/ach/

FedACH is an electronic automated clearing house (ACH) operated by the Federal Reserve Banks in the United States. It is one of the only two ACH operators in the country, the other being Electronic Payments Network, operated by The Clearing House Payments Company.

== Background and history ==
In the late 1960s, due to the increasing volumes of paper processing involved, the clearinghouse associations in the United States formed the Special Committee on Paperless Entries (SCOPE), while the American Bankers Association established a Monetary and Payments System (MAPS). As a result, the first automated clearing house (ACH) association was established in California in 1972, which was followed by the establishment of various ACHs across the United States. The Federal Reserve Bank of San Francisco was the first to operate the ACH in 1972, which was the beginning of FedACH.

In 1974, the National Automated Clearing House Association (NACHA) was formed to coordinate the ACHs nationally. In 1978, the local ACH associations were linked at a nationwide level with the Federal Reserve System. By the late 1980s, four ACH operators operating the United States–American Clearing House Association (ACHA), Electronic Payments Network (EPN), and Visa. By the early 2000s, only EPN, operated by The Clearing House Payments Company, and FedACH remained as the operating ACHs.

== Ownership and operations ==
The FedACH is operated by the Federal Reserve Banks. It is the only public operator in the ACH Network in the United States.

Earlier, physical media such as floppy disks and magnetic tapes, were used to transmit the ACH transactions through the FedACH system. Though these media were able to hold a substantially large amount of transactions, say for example, 1.5 million transactions could be recorded in a single tape, the process took a lot of time. In 1993, in order to speed up the processing, all participants of the system were required to install online connections, which reduced the processing time significantly.

In 2007, FedACH processed about 37 million transactions per day with an average aggregate value of about $58 billion. By 2024, it processed more than $42 trillion worth of transactions. The FedACH does batch processing of transactions, which are done six times a day as of 2023. In July 2023, the Federal Reserve launched the FedNow service, a real-time processing system for facilitating instant payments and transfers.

== See also ==
- Clearing House Interbank Payments System
- Depository Trust & Clearing Corporation
- FedWire
- Society for Worldwide Interbank Financial Telecommunication
