= Marketable collateral =

Marketable collateral is the exchange of financial assets, such as stocks and bonds, for a loan between a financial institution and borrower. To be deemed marketable collateral, assets must be capable of being sold under normal market conditions with reasonable promptness at a fair market value. Conditions are based upon actual transactions on an auction or similarly available daily bid, or ask price market.

For banks to accept a borrower’s loan proposal, collateral must be equal or greater than 100% of the loan or credit extension amount. The bank’s total outstanding loans and credit extensions to one borrower may not exceed 15 percent of the bank’s capital and surplus, plus an additional 10 percent of the bank’s capital and surplus.

== Risks ==
Declination of collateral value is the primary risk of securing loans with marketable collateral. Financial institutions closely monitor the market value of any financial asset held as collateral. and take appropriate action if the value subsequently declines below the predetermined maximum loan-to-value ration.
