= Plaid Inc. =

Financial technology company

- Logo since 2013
- Type: Private
- Industry: Financial technology and services
- Founded: May 2013; 13 years ago
- Founders: Zach Perret; William Hockey
- Headquarters: San Francisco, California, US
- Number of locations: 7 countries (US, Canada, UK, France, Spain, Ireland, Netherlands)
- Key people: Zach Perret (CEO); Will Robinson (CTO)
- Products: Transactions, Auth, Balance, Identity, Assets, Investments, Liabilities, Payment Initiation, Income, Monitor
- Revenue: ▲US$170 million (2020)
- Number of employees: 1,200
- Website: plaid.com

Plaid Inc. is an American financial services company based in San Francisco, California. The company builds a data transfer network that powers fintech and digital finance products.

Plaid's product, a technology platform, enables applications to connect with users' bank accounts. It allows consumers and businesses to interact with their bank accounts, check balances, and make payments through different financial technology applications. The company operates in the US, Canada, the UK, France, Spain, Ireland, and the Netherlands.

== History ==
Plaid was founded in 2012 by Zach Perret and William Hockey. The pair originally attempted to build consumer financial management products, including budgeting and bookkeeping software. When confronted with difficulties in connecting bank accounts required for these tools, they decided to pivot their core business focus to a unified banking API.

On January 13, 2020, Visa announced it intended to acquire Plaid for $5.3 billion. Visa CEO Alfred Kelly described the acquisition bid as an "insurance policy" to neutralize a "threat to our important US debit business." Visa later abandoned the deal after the United States Department of Justice sued to block it for antitrust reasons.

== Services ==
Plaid builds a data transfer network that powers Fintech and digital finance products. From the consumer side, this means they allow common apps such as Venmo and Chime to offer banking services without having to develop all the infrastructure themselves. For immediate linking of their bank funds, users of the apps are required to share their bank login credentials with Plaid. For some banks, Plaid will not receive user credentials and instead users will authorize access to bank data through their bank's portal.

In October 2020, Plaid announced the "all-new Plaid Link" to reduce the steps necessary to connect financial products.

The company added an instant payout feature based on the Real Time Payments (RTP) network to the Plaid Transfer product in April 2023. The service lets businesses disburse loan payments, payout insurance or wages in real-time. On May 15, 2026 Plaid and OpenAI announced a partnership allowing ChatGPT users to link their bank account with ChatGPT via Plaid.

== Funding ==
In late 2013, Plaid raised a $2.8 million seed round from Spark Capital, Google Ventures, and New Enterprise Associates. In 2014, Plaid raised $12.5 million from New Enterprise Associates.

On December 11, 2018, the company announced a $250 million Series C round with a valuation of $2.65 billion. The funding round was led by Mary Meeker, with Andreessen Horowitz and Index Ventures joining as new investors. Former backers Goldman Sachs, NEA and Spark Capital also participated. Plaid later stated that both Visa and Mastercard had invested in the round.

On April 7, 2021, Plaid raised a $425 million Series D at a valuation of $13.4 billion.

In 2025, Plaid raised $575 million in a funding round led by Franklin Templeton, Fidelity, BlackRock and former backers NEA and Ribbit Capital.

In February 2026, Plaid completed an employee share sale at an $8 billion valuation, a 31% increase from its $6.1 billion valuation in April 2025 yet 40% lower than its high of $13.4 billion, giving employees liquidity on their shares.

Round	Date	Lead Investor	Amount Raised	Valuation
Seed	September 19, 2013	Spark Capital	$2.8 million	—N/a
Series A	November 15, 2014	New Enterprise Associates	$12.5 million	—N/a
Series B	June 19, 2016	Goldman Sachs Investment Partners	$44 million	—N/a
Series C	December 11, 2018	Mary Meeker, Index Ventures, Andreessen Horowitz	$250 million	$2.65 billion
Series D	April 7, 2021	Altimeter Capital	$425 million	$13.4 billion
Strategic Sale	April 2025	Franklin Templeton, Fidelity, BlackRock, NEA, Ribbit Capital	$575 million	$6.1 billion
Employee Share Sale	February 2026	—	—	$8 billion

== Acquisitions ==
In January 2019, Plaid acquired competitor Quovo for $200 million.

In January 2022, Plaid announced it had acquired the identity verification and compliance platform Cognito for an undisclosed sum.

== Controversies ==
The company has faced controversy for scraping user data, impersonating bank login screens, and not properly disclosing the privacy risks associated with the service. TD Bank filed a lawsuit against Plaid in 2020 accusing the company of trying to "dupe" its users.

In 2021, Plaid settled a $58 million class action lawsuit over claims that it passed on personal banking data to third-party firms without user consent. The settlement encompasses five separate lawsuits combined as one. Each claims that Plaid used consumers' banking login credentials to gather and distribute detailed financial data without prior consent.

Plaid has "exploited its position as middleman," the plaintiffs alleged. Approximately 98 million people are affected by the settlement. Claimants will be given the option to receive the settlement money automatically through payment platforms such as PayPal and Venmo.

== See also ==
- Yodlee
- Data portability
- b.well
