= FedNow =

US Federal Reserve payment service

FedNow Service
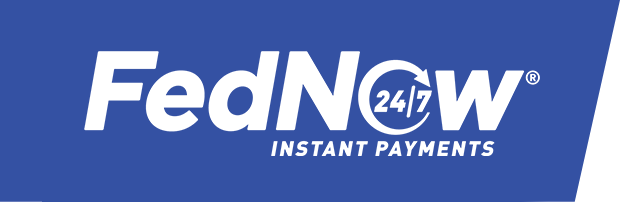
- Product type: Instant payment service
- Current owner: Federal Reserve
- Country: United States
- Introduced: 20 July 2023; 3 years ago
- Website: www.frbservices.org/financial-services/fednow

FedNow is an instant payment service developed by the Federal Reserve for financial institutions in the United States, which allows individuals and businesses to send and receive money. The service launched on July 20, 2023. Financial institutions are able to build products on top of the FedNow platform.

By 2025, over a thousand financial institutions were live on the service. The volume of settled payments on the service has grown steadily, exceeding one million payments in the first quarter of 2025 and two million of the second quarter of 2025 (over $2.7 billion in average daily volume).

== Operation ==
The FedNow Service began formal certification of participants in April 2023 and formally launched in July 2023. It operates on a 24-hour, 365-days-a-year basis, as opposed to the older FedACH system that is closed on weekends and holidays. FedNow charges financial institutions a transaction cost of $0.043 per transaction.

The FedNow Service is one of many instant payment services that have been developed around the world to offer immediate or close-to-immediate interbank transfers of money.

The Federal Reserve maintains a list of all financial institutions and fintech vendors that are certified and have live Send and/or Receive capabilities on the service.

== History ==
A private entity, The Clearing House Payments Company, launched Real Time Payments (RTP) in 2017. RTP is an instant payment system for all US financial institutions, owned by a group of large US banks.

In December 2019, noting the success of UPI in India, Google suggested that the US Federal Reserve Board should follow UPI as an example in developing FedNow, a real-time payment system for the United States.

In 2020, Lael Brainard announced the upcoming FedNow service would provide "a neutral platform on which the private sector can build to offer safe, efficient instant payment services to users across the country", after 2018 the European Central Bank launched the TIPS instant payment settlement system.

Real-time payments in the United States expanded with the launch of the FedNow Service in 2023. In the lead up to its July 2023 launch, Moody's Investor Service released a report stating the service would likely lead to gains for households and businesses, giving them lower-cost methods of moving their money. But it also noted incumbents in the payments space could see revenue declines, those participating could be forced to make upgrades in technology and staff, and there was a greater possibility of bank runs, even with potential benefits like lower costs and more efficiency in the payments ecosystem.

== See also ==
- Depository Trust & Clearing Corporation
- Fedwire
- Interbank network
- Single Euro Payments Area
- Real time gross settlement
- Notable instant payment systems by country
