= Korea Financial Telecommunications & Clearings Institute =

Korea Financial Telecommunications and Clearings Institute
- Native name: 금융결제원
- Type: Non-profit organization
- Industry: Finance
- Founded: 1986
- Headquarters: Seoul, South Korea
- Website: http://www.eng.kftc.or.kr/

- Korea Financial Telecommunications & Clearings Institute
- Hangul: 금융결제원
- Hanja: 金融決濟院
- RR: Geumyung gyeoljewon
- MR: Kŭmyung kyŏlchewŏn

Korea Financial Telecommunications and Clearings Institute (Korean: 금융결제원, KFTC) is a non-profit organization which manages several inter-bank payment systems in South Korea.

== Business ==
- Check clearing
  - Cashier's check truncation
  - Local L/C clearing
  - Corporate purchasing fund bill truncation
  - Electronic bonds
  - Management of dishonored bills
- Giro
  - Paper based giro (bill)
  - Electronic giro (Direct Debit / Direct Credit), similar to an automatic clearing house
  - Internet giro (electronic bill payment)
- Inter-bank network
  - CD/ATM network
  - IFT Network (Inter-bank Fund Transfer Network)
  - HOFINET (Inter-bank Home/Firm Banking Network)
  - K-Cash Network (Electronic Money Network)
  - CLS Network (and SWIFT Representative Office in Korea)
- Bank Joint Electronic Services
  - Accredited certification for internet/mobile banking (PKI-based)
  - KF-ISAC (Information Sharing and Analysis Center)
  - Retirement pension record-keeping
