= Automated clearing house =

Type of electronic network for financial transactions

An automated clearing house (ACH) is a computer-based electronic network for processing transactions, usually domestic low-value payments, between participating financial institutions. It may support both credit transfers and direct debits. The ACH system is designed to process batches of payments containing numerous transactions, and it charges fees low enough to encourage its use for low-value payments.

== History ==
The first automated clearing house was BACS in the United Kingdom, which started processing payments in April 1968. BACS operated from the beginning on a net settlement basis. Netting ACH transactions reduces the amount of deposits a bank must hold.

In the U.S. in the late 1960s, a group of banks in California sought a replacement for check payments. This led to the first automated clearing house in the US in 1972, operated by the Federal Reserve Bank of San Francisco.

== Operation ==
ACHs process large volumes of credit and debit transactions in batches. ACH credit transfers are initiated by the payer and include payments such as: direct deposits, payrolls, retail payments and vendor payments. ACH direct debit collections are initiated by the payee with pre-authorization from the payer; ACH direct debits include consumer payments such as utility bills, insurance premiums, mortgage loans, and other types of bills. Transactions received by the bank during the day are stored and transmitted in batches to the ACH. ACHs are net settlement systems, so settlement may be delayed for days, and there is some settlement risk. ACHs may allow for the transfer of a limited amount of additional information along with payment instructions.

ACH payments contrast with real-time gross settlement (RTGS) payments which are processed immediately by the central RTGS system and not subject to any waiting period on a one-to-one basis. ACH systems are typically used for low-value, non-urgent transactions while RTGS systems are typically used for high-value, urgent transactions.

=== Operations ===
This section describes in a generic way the typical operation of an ACH system. Each ACH system has its own specifics; see, for example, quick facts for the Nacha ACH Network in the United States and its terminology.

1. The ordering customer makes a transaction initiation, which can be either manually or by sending a file of initiation requests to a bank.
2. The bank gathers all transaction initiations for an ACH that arrive from different customers (combining manual and file-based).
3. On a periodic basis, the bank creates a file that it dispatches to the ACH either at the end of day or in cycles throughout the day.
4. The ACH operator combines the information submitted by the banks within each cycle (generally ACHs have several cycles throughout the day).
5. The ACH operator informs each bank of the net settlement amount for which they are responsible for the cycle.
6. The ACH operator ensures that the settlement amounts are received from all participants for the cycle, so that the cycle can be executed.
7. The ACH operator informs the destinator's bank of the transaction details.
8. When transaction arrives in the destination bank, the bank executes the transaction: such as crediting the payment to the beneficiary, while the ordering customer's bank debits the ordering customer's account.

== Existing systems ==
There are various ACH systems around the world. The World Bank identified 87 systems in their 2010 survey and 98 systems in their 2012 survey, while other sources have made qualitative analysis of a smaller number of ACH systems.

Country	System
Albania	AECH
Argentina	COELSA (Compensadora Electrónica)
Australia	Bulk Electronic Clearing System (BECS)
Austria	Payment Services Austria GmbH (PSA)
Azerbaijan	Xırda Ödənişlər üzrə Hesablaşma Klirinq Sistemi (XÖHKS) / Low Value Payments Clearing and Settlement System
Bahamas	Bahamas Automated Clearing House (BACH)
Bangladesh	Bangladesh Automated Clearing House (BACH)
Belgium	Centre for Exchange and Clearing (CEC)
Brazil	CIP-SILOC
Bulgaria	BISERA
Canada	Retail System, known formally as the Automated Clearing Settlement System (ACSS), run by Payments Canada
Cayman Islands	Cayman Islands Automated Clearing House
Chile	Centro de Compensación Automatizado (CCA)
China	Bulk Electronic Payment System (BEPS)
Colombia	ACH-Colombia and CENIT
Costa Rica	SINPE (Spanish: Sistema Nacional de Pagos Electrónicos; National System of Electronic Payments)
Croatia	Financial Agency (FINA)
Czech Republic	CERTIS (Czech Express Real Time Interbank Gross Settlement System)
Denmark	Eurogiro and Nets Group
Egypt	EG-ACH
Ethiopia	EthSwitch
Europe	Pan-European automated clearing house for the Single Euro Payments Area, STEP2
France	STET-CORE
Germany	Deutsche Bundesbank
Ghana	Ghana Interbank Payments and Settlement Systems (GhIPSS)
Greece	DIAS Interbanking Systems
Hungary	InterGIRO2 GIRO Zrt
Hong Kong	Hong Kong Interbank Clearing Limited
Iceland	Reiknistofa Bankanna (RB)
India	National Automated Clearing House and National Electronic Funds Transfer
Iran	PAYA system (Paayaa, پایا)
Israel	Bank Clearing Center (Masav)
Italy	Banca d'Italia, Nexi and SIA
Japan	Zengin (banking)
Latvia	Latvijas Banka
Mexico	SICAM (Sistema de Camaras)
Morocco	GSIMT (The Moroccan Interbank Remote Clearing System)
Moldova	National Bank of Moldova
Netherlands/Germany/Italy	equensWorldline
Nigeria	Nigeria Automated Clearing System (NACS)/ Nigeria Inter-Bank Settlement System Plc (NIBSS)
Norway	Norwegian Interbank Clearing System (NICS)
Pakistan	National Institutional Facilitation Technologies (NIFT) ACH
Philippines	PesoNet
Poland	National Clearing House (KIR)
Portugal	SIBS - Forward Payment Solutions (SIBS)
Peru	Camara de Compensacion Electronica (CCE)
Republic of Macedonia	Clearing House KIBS AD Skopje (KIBS)
Romania	Transfond ACH
Saudi Arabia	SARIE with both RTGS and ACH
Singapore	eGIRO which is part of Singapore Automated Clearing House
Slovenia	Bankart
South Africa	BankservAfrica
South Korea	HOFINET operated by Korea Financial Telecommunications & Clearings Institute
Spain	Iberpay
Sri Lanka	Common Electronic Fund Transfer Switch (CEFTS) operated by LankaClear
Sweden	Bankgirocentralen BGC AB
Switzerland	Swiss Interbank Clearing
Taiwan	Taiwan Clearing House
Ukraine	National Bank of Ukraine's System of Electronic Payments
United Kingdom	Bacs Payment Schemes Limited
United States	Federal Reserve Bank's FedACH and The Clearing House's Electronic Payments Network, underpinned by Nacha's ACH Network
Venezuela	Cámera de Compensación Electrónica (CCE)
Vietnam	Interbank Payment System (IBPS), operated by the State Bank of Vietnam

In addition, there are various ACH associations such as the European Automated Clearing House Association.

== Uses of the ACH payment system ==
There are various usages of ACH systems; the terminology related to different types of transactions varying in different countries. Most ACH payment systems support the following types:

- Credit transfer: non-immediate transfer of funds between accounts at different financial institutions for payments by retail customers and non-urgent business-to-business payments.
- Direct debit payment of consumer bills such as mortgages, loans, utilities, insurance premiums, rents, and any other regular or membership style payment. These types of payments are usually used by businesses that collect ongoing payments from the same customer.

== See also ==
- Clearing (finance)
- Clearing house (finance)
- Electronic funds transfer
- Pan-European automated clearing house
- Payment system
- Society for Worldwide Interbank Financial Telecommunication
- Wire transfer
