= The Clearing House =

Banking association of the United States

The Clearing House is a banking association and payments company owned by the largest commercial banks in the United States. The Clearing House is the parent organization of The Clearing House Payments Company L.L.C., which owns and operates core payments system infrastructure in the United States, including ACH, high-value wire transfers, check image clearing, electronic funds transfer (EFT) and a real-time payment network for the U.S., known as RTP®.

Supporting services include The Clearing House Payments Authority (a payments association with over 1,000 financial institution members and corporate subscribers) and ECCHO (an entity develops and maintains rules that govern private sector check image exchange for its members, and also engages in lobbying and education).

== Membership ==
Members of The Clearing House include JPMorgan Chase & Co., Bank of America Corp., Citigroup Inc., BNY, Deutsche Bank AG, U.S. Bancorp and Wells Fargo & Co. The Clearing House Payments Company, an organization owned by the same banks, was established in New York in 1853 for the purpose of processing transactions among banks. It has offices in New York and North Carolina.

- Bank of America
- Barclays
- BNY
- Capital One
- Citi
- Citizens
- Comerica
- Deutsche Bank
- Fifth Third Bank
- HSBC
- Huntington
- JPMorgan Chase
- KeyBank
- M&T Bank
- PNC
- Regions Bank
- Santander
- TD Bank
- Truist
- U.S. Bank
- Wells Fargo

== Lawsuits ==
In September 2009, the Clearing House joined a lawsuit in support of the Federal Reserve after a federal court in New York ruled against the Fed. Filed by Bloomberg News under the Freedom of Information Act, the lawsuit, Bloomberg L.P. v. Board of Governors of the Federal Reserve System, sought records showing where the Fed had lent $2 trillion of taxpayer funds in the bank bailout during the 2008 financial crisis. The Clearing House has filed an appeal before the United States Supreme Court on October 26, 2010. The case was appealed but ultimately rejected on March 21, 2011. The Federal Reserve was required to release the data within five days to Bloomberg L.P.

The Clearing House was also sued by the State of New York in Andrew Cuomo v. Clearing House Association, LLC to determine whether the U.S. Treasury's Office of the Comptroller of the Currency (OCC) had the authority to preempt a state's right to enforce its own fair lending laws against national banks. A 5–4 decision by the Supreme Court overturned previous lower court decisions that had ruled in favor of the Clearing House and the OCC.

== History ==
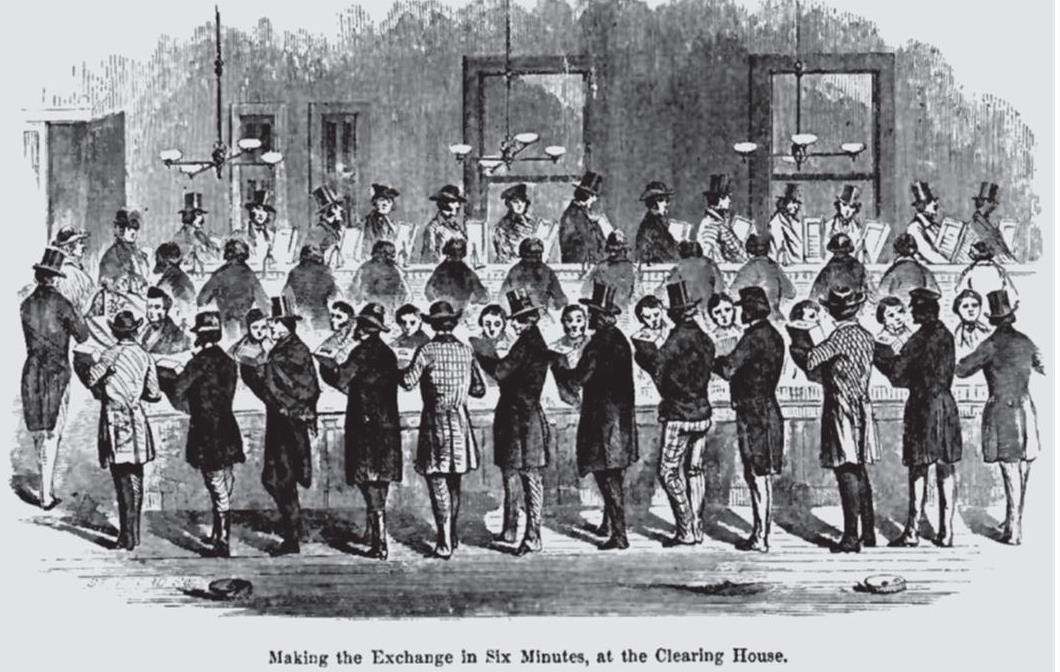
The New York Clearing House, Oval Table.

The New York Clearing House Association was a clearinghouse bank established in New York City in 1853. Initially, it simplified the chaotic settlement process among the banks of New York City. The New York Clearing House functioned as a quasi-central bank: setting monetary policy, issuing a form of currency, and even storing vaults of gold to back settlements. It later served to stabilize currency fluctuations and bolster the monetary system through recurring times of panic. Since the creation of the Federal Reserve System in 1913, it has used technology to meet the demands of an increasingly complex banking system.

=== Before 1853 ===
In the decade before the Clearing House was founded, banking had become increasingly complex. From 1849 to 1853 –years highlighted by the California gold rush and construction of a national railroad system–the number of New York banks increased from 24 to 57. Settlement procedures were unsophisticated, with banks settling their accounts by employing porters to travel from bank to bank to exchange checks for bags of coin, or “specie.” As the number of banks grew, exchanges became a daily event. The official reckoning of accounts, however, did not take place until Fridays, often resulting in record keeping errors and encouraging abuses. Each day, the porters would gather on the steps of one of the Wall Street banks for their “Porters’ Exchange.”

=== Founding, 1853 ===
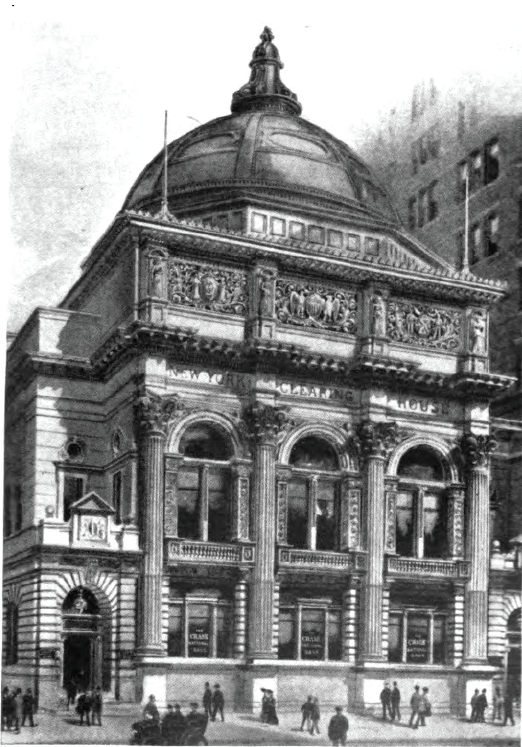
The New York Clearing House depicted in the 19th Century

In 1853, a bank bookkeeper named George D. Lyman proposed in an article that banks send and receive checks at a central office. There was a positive response and The New York Clearing House was organized officially on October 4 of that year. One week later, on October 11 in the basement of 14 Wall Street, 52 banks participated in the first exchange. On its first day, the Clearing House exchanged checks worth $22.6 million. Within 20 years, the average daily clearing topped $100 million. The current daily average approaches $2 trillion.

The New York Clearing House brought order to what had been a tangled web of exchanges. Specie certificates soon replaced gold as the means of settling balances at the Clearing House, further simplifying the process. Once certificates were exchanged for gold deposited at member banks, porters encountered fewer of the dangers they had faced previously while transporting bags of gold from bank to bank. Certificates relieved the strain on the bank's cash flow, thus reducing the likelihood of a run on deposits. Member banks had to do weekly audits, keep minimum reserve levels and log daily settlement of balances which further assured more ordered, efficient exchanges.

=== Calming the panics, 1853-1913 ===
Between 1853 and 1913, the U.S. experienced rapid economic expansion as well as ten financial panics. One of the Clearing House's first challenges was the panic of 1857. When the panic began, leaders of the member banks met and devised a plan that would shorten the duration of the panic–and more importantly, maintain public confidence in the banking system. When specie payments were suspended, the Clearing House issued loan certificates that could be used to settle accounts. Known as Clearing House Loan Certificates, they were, in effect, quasi-currency, backed not by gold but by discounted county and state bank notes held by member banks. Bearing the words “Payable Through the Clearing House,” a Clearing House Loan Certificate was the joint liability of all the member banks, and thus, in lieu of specie, a most secure form of payment.

The certificates appeared in smaller denominations during the panic of 1873, and continued to be used as a substitute currency among the member banks for settlement purposes during panics in subsequent decades, including the Panic of 1893. Although they represented a potential violation of federal law against privately issued currencies, these certificates, as a contemporary observer noted, “performed so valuable a service…in moving the crops and keeping business machinery in motion, that the government…wisely forbore to prosecute.”

In 1913, Congress passed the Federal Reserve Act, thus creating an independent, federal clearing system modeled on the many private clearing houses that had sprung up across America. The new monetary system, with its stringent audits and minimum reserve standards, assumed the role that clearing houses had played.

=== Clearing process during the 20th century ===
Since the inception of the Federal Reserve System, the New York Clearing House has concentrated on facilitating the smooth completion of financial transactions by clearing the payments. The clearing process, while highly structured, is in theory, quite simple. Member banks exchange checks, coupons and other certificates of value among themselves, after which the Clearing House records the resulting charges to their accounts. Entries are posted on the books of the Federal Reserve Bank of New York to settle any differences. Settlement is prepared each business day at 10:00 a.m. after about three million pieces of paper have been presented for payment.

Computers have been performing the payment clearing that once required paper processing. The Clearing House Interbank Payments System (CHIPS) began operation in 1970. The New York Automated Clearing House (NYACH) followed in 1975 and became the Electronics Payment Network (EPN) in 2000. The Clearing House Electronic Check Clearing System (CHECCS) was added in 1992. The RTP network, an instant payments system, was added in 2017.

On July 1, 2004, The New York Clearing House Association announced a name change to The Clearing House Association L.L.C..

== See also ==
- ACH
- Bankers' clearing house
- Clearing house
- Clearing House Interbank Payments System
- History of central banking in the United States
- Suffolk Bank
