= Euro Banking Association =

Banking industry forum

- Association bancaire pour l'euro

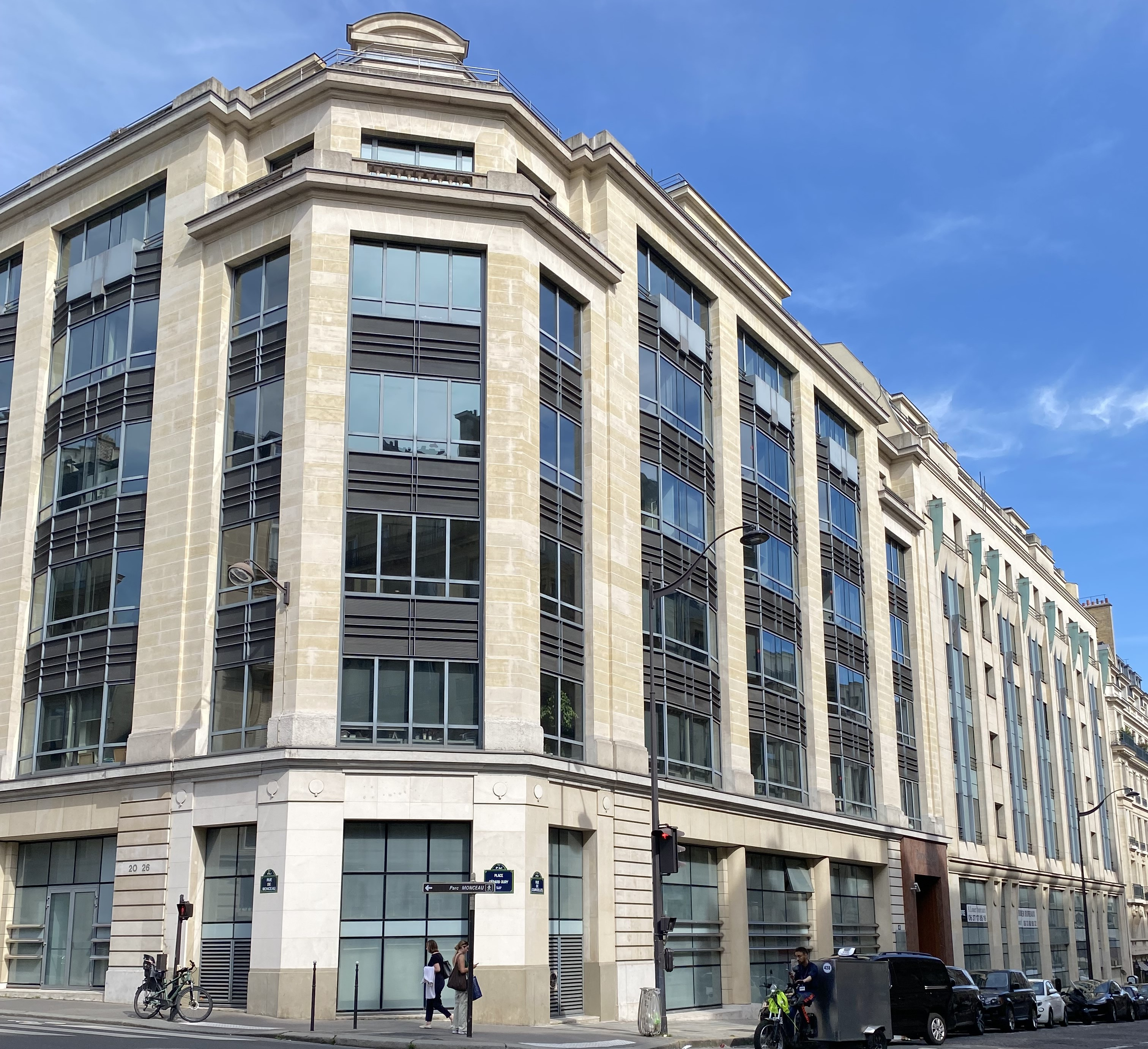
- Seat of the Euro Banking Association in Rue de Courcelles in Paris
- Abbreviation: ABE-EBA
- Established: 1985; 41 years ago
- Founder: 18 commercial banks and the European Investment Bank
- Type: Trade association
- Legal status: Nonprofit organization
- Purpose: Support and create dialog between European payments industry practitioners
- Location: Paris, France
- Region served: Europe
- Members: Nearly 200 members that consist of banks and related payment providers (2024)
- Official languages: English, French
- Secretary General: Thomas Egner
- Funding: Membership fees
- Website: www.abe-eba.eu

The Euro Banking Association (EBA), also referred by its French acronym ABE-EBA (French: Association bancaire pour l'euro), is a trade association for the European payments industry with close to 200 member banks and organisations from the European Union and around the world aimed at fostering and driving pan-European payment initiatives. The ABE-EBA has strived to contribute to the creation of a standardised Single Euro Payments Area (SEPA).

The EBA was instrumental in the establishment in June 1998 of EBA Clearing, to which it transferred projects that were under development at the time including EURO1, but has always been a separate organization.

== History and structure ==
The ABE-EBA was founded in Paris in 1985 by 18 commercial banks and the European Investment Bank. The European Commission as well as the Bank for International Settlements (BIS) supported the founding of the ABE-EBA. Since then, the number of members has risen to almost 200. The institutions come from all member states of the European Union as well as from Norway, Switzerland, Australia, China, Japan, the United Arab Emirates and the United States.

In its early years, the agenda of the ABE-EBA included the promotion of the European Monetary Union (EMU) and the development and management of a private industry ECU clearing system stretching across Europe. This was transferred in 1999 to EBA Clearing.

== Member banks ==
As of end-2024 the following banks were members of ABE-EBA, with national classification as indicated on the association's website:

- (Spain) Abanca
- (Netherlands) ABN AMRO
- (Finland) Aktia Bank
- (Republic of Ireland) Allied Irish Banks
- (Greece) Alpha Bank
- (Italy) Banca Monte dei Paschi di Siena
- (Italy) Banca Popolare del Lazio
- (Italy) Banca Popolare di Sondrio
- (Italy) Banca Sella
- (Portugal) Banco BAI Europa
- (Spain) Banco Bilbao Vizcaya Argentaria
- (Italy) Banco BPM
- (Portugal) Banco Comercial Português
- (Spain) Banco Cooperativo Español
- (Spain) Banco Sabadell
- (Portugal) Banco Montepio
- (Spain) Banco Santander
- (Austria) Bank für Tirol und Vorarlberg
- (Luxembourg) Bank GPB international
- (Germany) Bank of America Europe
- (Germany) Bank of China
- Bank of Finland
- (Republic of Ireland) Bank of Ireland
- Bank of Slovenia
- (Finland) Bank of Åland
- (Spain) Bankinter
- (Luxembourg) Banque et Caisse d'Épargne de l'État
- Banque Internationale à Luxembourg
- (France) Banque Michel Inchauspé
- (United Kingdom) Barclays
- (Belgium) Belfius
- (Italy) BFF Bank
- (Austria) BKS Bank
- (Belgium) BNP Paribas Fortis
- (Finland) Bonum Bank
- (France) BPCE
- (Italy) BPER Banca
- (Belgium) bpost
- (France) BRED Banque Populaire
- (Portugal) Caixa Central de Crédito Agrícola Mútuo
- (Spain) CaixaBank
- (Spain) Caja Laboral
- (Italy) Cassa di Risparmio di Fermo
- (Spain) Cecabank
- (Finland) Central Bank of Savings Banks
- (United Kingdom) Citibank Europe
- (Germany) Commerzbank
- (Italy) Credito Emiliano
- (France) Crédit Agricole
- (France) Crédit Mutuel Arkéa
- (Denmark) Danske Bank
- (Netherlands) De Nederlandsche Bank
- (Germany) Deutsche Bank
- (Germany) Deutsche Bundesbank
- (Finland) DnB Bank Helsinki branch
- (Germany) DZ Bank
- (Republic of Ireland) Elavon Financial Services
- (Austria) Erste Group Bank
- (Greece) Eurobank Ergasias
- (Germany) Fondsdepot Bank
- (Cyprus) Hellenic Bank
- (United Kingdom) HSBC Bank Plc
- (France) HSBC Continental Europe
- (Netherlands) ING Bank
- (Italy) Intesa Sanpaolo
- (Germany) Joh. Berenberg, Gossler und Co.
- (United Kingdom) JPMorgan Chase London Branch
- (Belgium) KBC Bank
- (Germany) KfW
- (France) La Banque postale
- (Germany) Landesbank Baden-Württemberg
- (Germany) Landesbank Hessen-Thueringen
- (United Kingdom) LHV Bank Ltd
- (United Kingdom) Lloyds Bank
- (United Kingdom) MUFG Bank Ltd
- National Bank of Greece
- (United Kingdom) National Westminster Bank
- (Finland) Nordea
- (Austria) Oberbank
- (Austria) Oesterreichische Nationalbank
- (Finland) OP Corporate Bank
- (Hungary) OTP Bank
- (Netherlands) Rabobank
- (Austria) Raiffeisen Bank International
- (Italy) Raiffeisen Landesbank Südtirol
- (Austria) Raiffeisenlandesbank Oberösterreich
- (Finland) S-Bank
- (Germany) Swiss Euro Clearing Bank
- (Sweden) Skandinaviska Enskilda Banken
- (France) Société Générale
- (Denmark) Sparekassen Sjælland
- (Germany) Standard Chartered Bank AG
- (Sweden) Svenska Handelsbanken
- (Sweden) Swedbank
- (Denmark) Sydbank
- (Germany) UBS Europe SE
- UniCredit Bank Austria AG
- (Germany) UniCredit Bank GmbH
- (Italy) UniCredit
- (United Kingdom) Wells Fargo UK

== Leadership ==
In 1986, the ABE-EBA appointed Gilbert Lichter as its secretary-general, a position he held until 1989 and again from 1992 to 2016. Since 2016, the secretary-general of the ABE-EBA has been Mr Thomas Egner.
