= Clearing House Interbank Payments System =

US private clearing house

The Clearing House Interbank Payments System, commonly known as the CHIPS network, is the largest private sector USD clearing and settlement network in the world for high-value wire payments. The network, along with several other U.S. payment systems, is operated by The Clearing House Payments Company L.L.C. (The Clearing House), which is owned by member financial institutions.

The CHIPS network clears and settles $2.2 trillion in domestic and international payments each business day.

== Overview ==
The CHIPS network is used for large-value U.S. dollar payments between participating financial institutions. It supports domestic U.S. dollar transfers and the U.S. dollar portion of international transactions. The system is frequently used in correspondent banking and cross-border payment activity and processes approximately 96 percent of cross-border U.S. dollar payments.

The CHIPS network operates as a hybrid settlement system that combines real-time final settlement with a liquidity savings algorithm designed to optimize funding efficiency for participating financial institutions. The system generates more than $5 billion in estimated annual liquidity savings for participants.

Since its launch in 1970, the network has evolved to reduce systemic risk and improve operational efficiency. In 1981, the network moved from next-day settlement to same-day settlement, which shortened the settlement cycle for participants. In 2001, the network replaced its end-of-day deferred settlement model with an intraday settlement system, allowing payments to settle as messages are released. The new model introduced continuous netting and final settlement during the operating day, improving liquidity management and reducing settlement risk.

In July 2012, the Financial Stability Oversight Council (FSOC) designated The Clearing House, on the basis of its role as operator of the CHIPS network, as a systemically important financial market utility (SIFMU) under Title VIII of the Dodd-Frank Act. The designation is in recognition of the network’s critical role in the U.S. financial system, including its liquidity-saving functionality. The Federal Reserve Board identifies The Clearing House, in its role as the CHIPS network operator, as a designated financial market utility for which the Board is the supervisory agency.

In April 2024, The Clearing House migrated the CHIPS network to the ISO 20022 message format for payment and payment-related messages.

== CHIPS liquidity algorithm and settlement model ==
Unlike traditional real-time gross settlement systems that settle high-value transactions individually and immediately, the CHIPS network features a patented liquidity-saving algorithm that utilizes multilateral and bilateral netting, intelligent queuing, and continuous intraday net settlement with finality. Over a 21-hour processing day, the algorithm selects payments from the queue for release and settlement in a liquidity-efficient manner— with payments either released individually or are offset (bilaterally or multilaterally) and released.

The system continuously nets payment obligations between participants and settles payments when they are released. This design reduces the amount of liquidity participants need to settle large-value payments compared with a gross settlement system, while still providing final settlement when payments are released. The CHIPS algorithm provides participating financial institutions increased liquidity savings, freeing funds for lending, investment, and other activities. In 2025, liquidity efficiency on the network measured 26:1, meaning that every $1 of intraday funding supported $26 in settled value. Additionally, the network delivered $5.5 billion in annualized liquidity savings for participating banks, with an average of $15.4 million in liquidity savings per day.

== ISO 20022 ==
In April 2024, the CHIPS network successfully migrated to the ISO 20022 message format, making it the first high-value payment system in the U.S. to adopt the new messaging standard developed by the International Organization for Standardization (ISO). On its first day of operations on the new format, the CHIPS network settled more than 555,000 payments for a total value of $1.81 trillion.

ISO 20022 standardizes the language for financial messaging internationally and enhances the efficiency of global payments. Participants on the CHIPS network can utilize the format’s richer data for extended remittance information, sanctions and compliance screening, and more efficient cross-border payments.

== Legal framework, finality and regulation ==
The CHIPS network is governed by a legal and operating framework that includes the CHIPS Rules, participant agreements, and applicable law, including New York Uniform Commercial Code Article 4-A.

As a designated financial market utility, The Clearing House is subject to the supervisory framework established under Title VIII of the Dodd-Frank Act. The Federal Reserve Board is the supervisory agency for The Clearing House in its role as operator of the CHIPS network, and The Clearing House must comply with Regulation HH, which sets risk-management standards for designated financial market utilities.

== List of members ==
Participation in the CHIPS network is available to depository institutions and foreign banks that meet the requirements set forth in the CHIPS network rules, which include that a participant must have an office in the United States that is subject to federal or state regulation and qualify as a financial institution under the Federal Deposit Insurance Corporation Improvement Act. Participants must also have the ability to meet their opening and closing funding obligations.

A financial institution that is not a CHIPS network participant may still send payments on the CHIPS network indirectly through a participant, typically through a correspondent banking relationship.

As of 2026, the 43 direct member participants (with country of ownership) are:

- Banco Bilbao Vizcaya, S.A. (Spain)
- Banco do Brasil S.A. (Brazil)
- Bangkok Bank Public Company Limited (Thailand)
- Bank of America, N.A. (United States)
- Bank of China (China)
- Bank of Communications (China)
- The Bank of Tokyo-Mitsubishi UFJ, Ltd. (Japan)
- Barclays Bank PLC (United Kingdom)
- BNP Paribas New York (France)
- Brown Brothers Harriman & Company (United States)
- China Merchants Bank (China)
- Citibank, N.A. (United States)
- Commerzbank AG (Germany)
- Crédit Agricole (France)
- Deutsche Bank AG (Germany)
- Deutsche Bank Trust Co Americas (formerly Bankers Trust; United States)
- Fifth Third Bank (United States)
- Habib American Bank (United States)
- HSBC Bank USA (United States)
- Huntington Bancshares Incorporated (United States)
- Industrial and Commercial Bank of China (China)
- Intesa Sanpaolo (Italy)
- Israel Discount Bank of New York (United States)
- JPMorgan Chase Bank, N.A. (United States)
- KBC Bank N.V. (Belgium)
- Manufacturers and Traders Trust Company (United States)
- Mashreq Bank (United Arab Emirates)
- Mega International Commercial Bank (Taiwan)
- Mizuho Corporate Bank - NY (Japan)
- Morgan Stanley (United States)
- The Bank of New York Mellon (United States)
- The Northern Trust Company (United States)
- PNC Bank (United States)
- Société Générale (France)
- Standard Chartered Bank (United Kingdom)
- State Bank of India (India)
- State Street Bank and Trust Company (United States)
- Sumitomo Mitsui Banking Corporation (Japan)
- Truist Bank (United States)
- UBS AG (Switzerland)
- Valley National Bank (United States)
- Wells Fargo Bank, NY INTL (United States)
- Wells Fargo Bank, San Francisco

== See also ==
- The Clearing House
- SIFMU
- Society for Worldwide Interbank Financial Telecommunication (SWIFT)
