= Fedwire =

Real-time gross settlement by Federal Reserve Banks

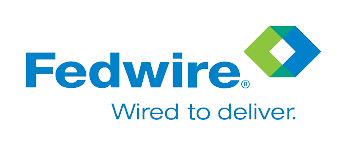
- Product type: real-time gross settlement service
- Current owner: Federal Reserve
- Country: United States
- Introduced: 1915; 111 years ago
- Website: www.federalreservehistory.org/essays/fedwire

Fedwire (formerly known as the Federal Reserve Wire Network) is a real-time gross settlement funds transfer system operated by the United States Federal Reserve Banks that allows financial institutions to electronically transfer funds between its more than 9,289 participants (as of 19 March 2009). Transfers can only be initiated by the sending bank once they receive the proper wiring instructions for the receiving bank. These instructions include: the receiving bank's routing number, account number, recipient's name and dollar amount being transferred. This information is submitted to the Federal Reserve via the Fedwire system. Once the instructions are received and processed, the Fed will debit the funds from the sending bank's reserve account and credit the receiving bank's account. Once processed, Fedwire transfers settle immediately between participants, with final and irrevocable settlement.

In conjunction with Clearing House Interbank Payments System (CHIPS), Fedwire is the primary U.S. network for large-value or time-critical domestic and international payments. Fedwire is designed to be highly resilient.

The Fedwire system has grown since its inception, seeing growth in both number of transfers and total transaction dollar value of about 79% and 207% respectively between 1996 and 2016.

In 2022, Fedwire processed roughly 196 million transfers with a total value of just over one quadrillion US dollars.

== History ==
In the early 1900s, settlement of interbank payments was often done by the physical delivery of cash or gold. By 1915, the Federal Reserve Banks began to move funds electronically. In 1918, a proprietary telecommunications system to process funds transfers was implemented, connecting all 12 Reserve Banks, the Federal Reserve Board and the U.S. Treasury by telegraph using Morse code. Starting in the 1920s up until the 1970s, the system remained largely telegraphic; however as technology improved, they began to make the shift from telegraphy towards telex, then to computer operations and then to proprietary telecommunications networks.

In the early 1980s, Fedwire was taxed to its limit with the result that it was often subject to "throttle", which means that it took messages from the banks more slowly than its normal speed. From a user's point of view, throttle was like being put on hold every time one sent a message to the Fed. In 1983, the Fed made a major upgrade of the automated system it uses to support Fedwire. Because the major banks could not tolerate a long breakdown in their operations, the Fed designed its internal systems so that the maximum down time for a breakdown would be limited to a few minutes or a few hours at most. In an effort to improve operational efficiency, in the 1990s, the Reserve Banks consolidated most mainframe computer operations and centralized certain payment applications. More recently, the Reserve Banks have taken advantage of the flexibility and efficiency that Internet protocol (IP) and distributed processing technologies offer. These technologies have improved reliability and efficiency of Fedwire greatly. Today, three data processing centers support the Fedwire services. One site supports the primary processing environment with on-site backup. A second site serves an active, "hot" backup facility with on-site backup. A third site serves as a "warm" backup facility. The three data processing centers are located a considerable distance from one another (i.e., hundreds of miles) in order to mitigate the effects of natural disasters, power and telecommunication outages, and other wide-scale, regional disruptions. In addition, all three data processing centers have appropriate security and include various contingency features, such as redundant power feeds, environmental and emergency control systems, dual computer and network operations centers, and dual customer service centers.

Until 1981, Fedwire services were free, and only Federal Reserve member banks could transact on it. The Depository Institutions Deregulation and Monetary Control Act of 1980 required most Federal Reserve Bank financial services to be priced, while giving nonmember depository institutions direct access to these priced services. Fees were now applicable to several services, including funds transfers and securities safekeeping. Banks are charged a gross transfer fee of $0.82 for every transaction, however there is a three-tiered discount schedule, which results in actual transaction fees costing in 2015 between $0.034 and $0.82 per transaction depending on transaction volume.

== See also ==
- Fedwire Securities Service
- Daylight overdraft
- FedACH
- T2 (RTGS), Fedwire's equivalent in the euro area
- Real-time gross settlement (RTGS)
- National Automated Clearing House (NACH)
- Society for Worldwide Interbank Financial Telecommunication (SWIFT)
- Structured Financial Messaging System (SFMS)
- System for Transfer of Financial Messages (SPFS)
- Wire transfer
