= Enterprise legal management =

Field of business administration on legal issues

Enterprise legal management (ELM) is a practice management strategy of corporate legal departments, insurance claims departments, and government legal and contract management departments.

ELM developed during the 1990s in response to increased corporate demands for accountability, transparency, and predictability. It employs software to manage internal legal documents and workflows, electronic billing and invoicing, and to guide decision-making through reporting and analytics.

== Definitions ==
Still an evolving term, ELM is a recognized management discipline and a strategic objective of general counsel. Some have argued that ELM falls within the broader category of corporate governance, risk, and compliance (GRC); others maintain that ELM and GRC are separate entities along a continuum.

Separate but related technologies include information governance, electronic discovery, legal hold, contract management, corporate secretary, and board of directors’ communications. ELM software may integrate some or all of these components.

== Historical development ==
=== Early practice management ===
Law practice management refers to the business aspect of operating a law firm or in-house legal team. Components include economics, workplace communication and management, ethics, and client service.

Historically, corporate legal spend was considered a “black box” with limited predictability and transparency, making it difficult for corporate legal teams to parse differences of efficiency and cost among outside firms, or to benchmark firm performance against previously hired counsel.

=== Transition and early adoption ===
Several factors led to a shift away from traditional, low-technology solutions and toward ELM, most notably the expansion of the Internet during the 1990s and subsequent development of Software as a service (SaaS) platforms. Within legal departments, factors included greater regulatory compliance risk, smaller budgets, and board member demands for greater accountability, predictability, and transparency.

Over time, the demand for budgetary information, including metrics such as the ratio of legal spend to total enterprise revenue, extended beyond board members to include other stakeholders. Corporate legal departments were positioned as the next frontier of corporate efficiency and risk management, and encouraged to operate as a true business partner. This created pressure to reduce costs and, when possible, generate revenue for the larger enterprise.

Departments’ varied sizes and responsibilities created a range of practice management needs. A legal department with a small number of in-house attorneys might oversee thousands of cases managed by outside counsel, while a large internal legal department could handle most cases in-house. Smaller departments focused on management of workflow, collaboration, and spend management; larger departments had greater needs for internal matter management, attorney utilization, and document management.

The first electronic transitions were to generic matter management applications, which replaced paper files as the system of record.

=== Specialization and expansion ===
Initial enterprise resource planning systems did not meet the specific needs of legal departments. External legal costs presented unique management challenges because of the billable-hour model and unpredictable labor requirements. Software specialization integrated matter management and preexisting, internal billing software. This integration provided the opportunity to meet management demands for increased communication and information from within corporate legal departments. Ultimately, it extended further to combine legal information with finance, compliance, and risk-management departments.

These developments also presented risks to enterprise-wide information management. Specialized software generated the potential for conflicts between company‐wide enterprise solutions and the ELM systems of in-house legal departments. Additionally, maintaining data security was and remains a preeminent concern, especially for SaaS-based ELM platforms. One in four chief legal officers (CLOs) reported a data breach during 2013–15, with the health-care industry especially vulnerable.

== ELM software ==
The expansion of ELM as a practice management strategy was fostered by the growth of ELM software. That growth, in turn, was made possible through the expansion of the Internet and adoption of SaaS platforms across a wide range of industries. Total revenue of all SaaS providers accelerated into the 2010s, with the International Data Corporation (IDC) forecasting revenue to grow from $22.6 billion to $50.8 billion during 2014–18.

ELM software primarily supports matter management and electronic billing, with derived analytics and reporting guiding legal department business processes. As of 2013, the maturity level of the industry was characterized as early mainstream, with market penetration of less than 20%.

A Blue Hill Research report stated that economic motivations have encouraged adoption, with an average return on investment of 766%; median spend contraction of 4.5% from automated processing and rejection of nonconforming invoices; and median recurring annual spend reduction of 4% from use of analytics to support data-driven spend management.

Variables affecting the purchase of ELM software include considerations of license type, usage scope, maintenance and support, installation location, and license fee calculation. Vendors employ a range of licensing practices, with no model inherently advantaged or disadvantaged.

=== Components of ELM software ===
==== Matter management ====
Matter management includes the storage and retrieval of all data related to matters handled by a legal department, including the creation, revision, approval, and consumption of legal documents. Matter management is used to facilitate document collaboration internally and with outside counsel. In complex legal matters such as mass tort litigation, ELM software provides matter management capabilities such as batch uploading of invoices to expedite review and approval.

==== Electronic billing ====
Electronic billing provides a centralized repository for legal bills and invoices, and a method to deliver those bills securely for review and payment. ELM software integrates with internal electronic billing software through the Legal Electronic Data Exchange Standard (LEDES) format, which has standardized the transfer of legal data. Development of LEDES in the late 1990s was supplemented by the American Bar Association’s creation of Uniform Task-Based Management System (UTBMS) to establish consistent coding of services by outside counsel.

Electronic billing automates review for compliance errors, allocation to cost centers, and routing for approval. Independent research suggests that it reduces costs by decreasing manual labor and paper costs.

==== Analytics and business process management ====
Matter management and electronic billing data collected by ELM software is used to generate reports and provide analytics that influence business process management within legal departments.

According to a Gartner survey, CLOs increasingly focus on regulatory compliance, customer and stakeholder satisfaction, and risk management. Efforts to reduce legal spend center on the reduction of outside counsel costs, achieved through the negotiation of alternative fee arrangements, increased reliance on internal counsel, and convergence of outside counsel. Use of flat fees for entire matters grew from 12 to 20% during 2013–15, with larger legal departments—those serving companies with at least $4 billion in annual revenue—more than twice as likely to use a flat fee structure compared to companies with less than $100 million in annual revenue.

Legal departments use analytics to inform these budgeting and forecasting decisions, with the selection of outside law firms based on tradeoffs between cost and attorney performance. Internal historical billing data and industry benchmarks identify trends and differences among providers, and average fees associated with matter types. Some ELM software vendors offer comparative metrics harvested from subscribers.

Recent developments within ELM software include the utilization of machine learning and artificial intelligence in order to predict claims costs. These types of predictions are intended to reduce insurer's combined ratio by driving early settlements for claims likely to carry a greater than average cost. ELM vendors that offer these predictive claims include LSG, Jalubro and Thomson Reuters. Early data regarding return on investment of predictive data analytics suggests average legal spend reductions of 6-11%

== See also ==
- Corporate lawyers
- General counsel
- Legal governance, risk management, and compliance
