= ACH Network =

United States automated clearing house

In the United States, the ACH Network is the national automated clearing house (ACH) for electronic funds transfers established in the 1960s and 1970s. It is a financial utility owned by US banks, and is one of the largest payments networks in the United States, both by volume and by customer reach; virtually every bank account in the US, whether personal or commercial, is connected to the network.

ACH has a wide variety of consumer and enterprise applications, processing financial transactions for consumers, businesses, and federal, state, and local governments. ACH processes large volumes of credit and debit transactions in batches. ACH credit transfers include direct deposit for payroll, Social Security, and other benefit payments, tax refunds, and vendor payments. ACH direct debit transfers include consumer payments on insurance premiums, mortgage loans, and other kinds of bills.

The rules and regulations that govern the ACH network are established and maintained by the nonprofit National Automated Clearinghouse Association (Nacha).

In 2018, the network processed 23 billion transactions with a total value of $51.2 trillion. Contrast this with the card payment networks in the US, which in the same time period processed under $10 trillion in payments.

== History ==
The ideas leading to the ACH arose in the late 1960s, evolving from the existing US paper checks system. One early predecessor was a US federal initiative used to help United States Air Force personnel get their paychecks on time. The success of this initiative led to an expansion to other employees and the government adopted it as a major payroll standard.

Separately in 1968 a group of check clearinghouse associations set up The Special Committee on Paperless Entries (SCOPE) to build an automated payment system after concerns for the number of checks being cleared for payrolls. The participants were exchanging physical checks, and using magnetic ink character recognition (MICR) technology to extract the check information for the end recipient of the check, which led to the insight that a central system could use MICR to extract check data, and then exchange that information between participants, instead of the physical checks themselves.

This led to the first ACH association, formed in California in 1972. Other regional ACH associations followed. The difficulty in compliance between different organizations led them to unite to form National Automated Clearinghouse Association (Nacha) in 1974.

As with all social networks, ACH faced a chicken-or-the-egg problem in that it was difficult to convince consumers to want to move funds via this method if banks didn't support it, and it was difficult to convince banks to join the network if customers weren't clamoring to use ACH. Arguably the single most important event in the history of the development of ACH was the United States Social Security Administration trialing direct deposit of Supplemental Security Income via the ACH network in 1975. This meant that joining the network enabled banks' customers to receive Social Security benefits via direct deposit instead of via paper check, which drove many US banks to quickly sign up with the network.

Nacha consolidated and added new rules which led to ACH. As computer and telecommunication technology advanced over the next few years, the system continued to develop. By 1978, electronic funds transfers were available.

From the late 1980s through to the 2000s, the system continued to develop with a number of enhancements. In 2001, there was a major reorganization of Nacha which led to financial institutions insured by the Federal Deposit Insurance Corporation becoming direct members, making it much easier for the ACH network to be used by banks; that same year internet payments also went into effect, which would go on to be a big part of ACH payments.

Today, all US banks and credit unions are members of the network.

== Uses of the ACH payment system ==
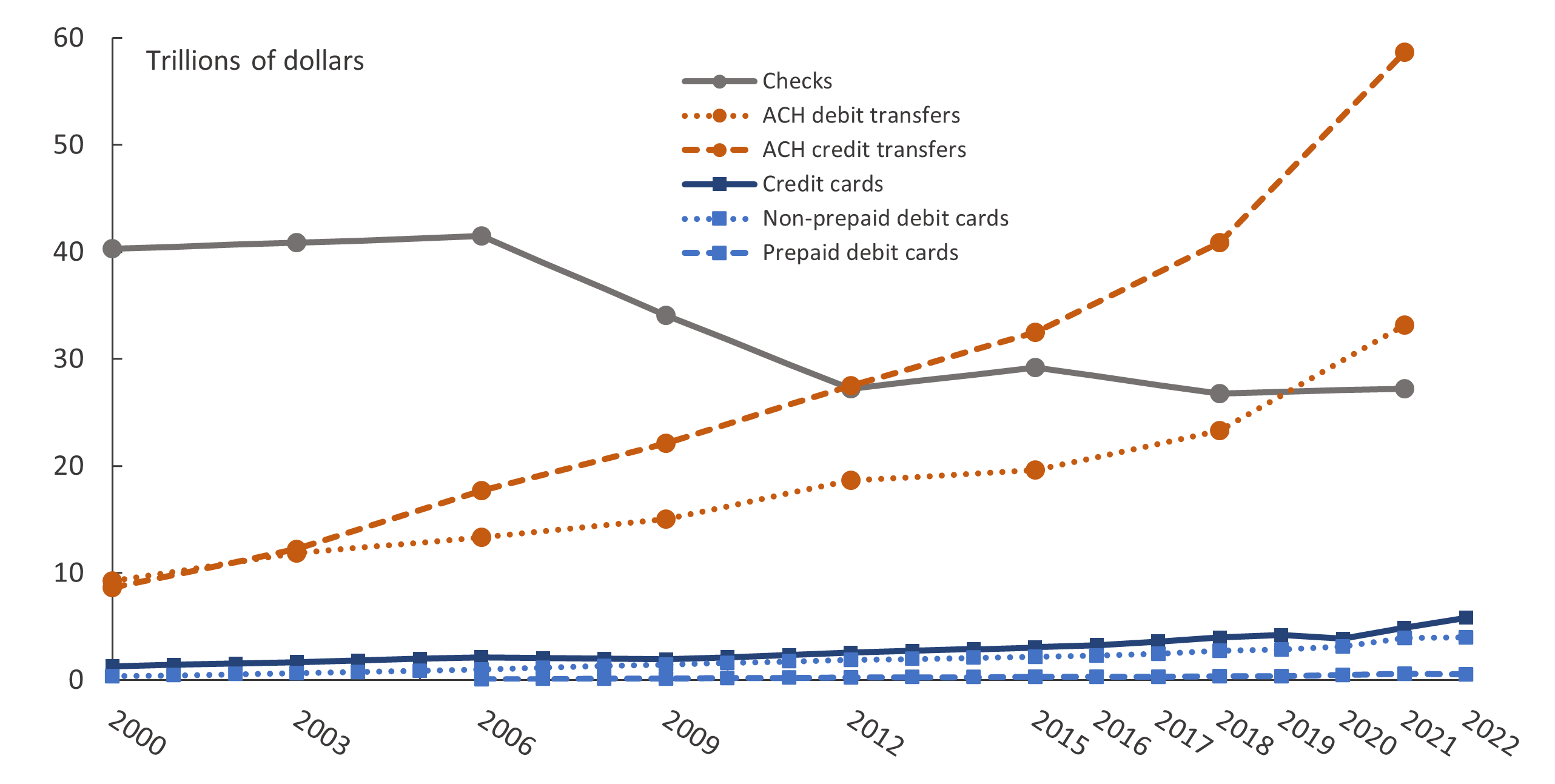
US Federal Reserve historical analysis of different payment methods by trillions of payment dollar volume. ACH are the two upward moving orange lines. Card payments are the three blue lines at the bottom.

- Bank treasury management departments sell this service to business and government customers
- Business-to-business payments
- Direct debit payment of consumer bills such as mortgages, loans, utilities, insurance premiums, rents, and any other regular payment
- Direct deposit of payroll, Social Security and other government payments, and tax refunds
- E-commerce payments
- Federal, state, and local tax payments
- Non-immediate transfer of funds between accounts at different financial institutions (when a real-time transfer is required, a wire transfer using a system such as the Federal Reserve's Fedwire is employed instead)

== Types of ACH transactions ==
ACH is the only major payment system in the United States that features both "push" (or ACH credit) and "pull" (or ACH debit) transactions.

=== ACH debit transaction ===
The payee's sending institution creates, batches, and transmits an ACH debit transaction to the payor's receiving institution. The ACH debit transaction instructs the receiving institution to withdraw and transmit the funds from the payor's bank account to the sending institution.

The receiving institution must send the return to the sending institution by the end of the following business day if it is unable to debit the funds from the payor's account, such if the account was not found, the account was closed, or the account was frozen.

For an ACH debit transaction, the sending institution may be a third-party bank, rather than the payee's bank.

=== ACH credit transaction ===
The payor's sending institution creates, batches, and transmits an ACH credit to the payee's receiving institution. The ACH credit transaction instructs the receiving institution to credit the funds to the payee's bank account.

The receiving institution must send the return to the sending institution by the end of the following business day if it is unable to credit the funds to the payee's account, such as if the account was not found, was closed, or was frozen.

For an ACH credit, the sending institution may not be a third-party bank, rather than the payor's bank.

== Payment flow ==
In both ACH debit and ACH credit scenarios, the transaction is started by an originator. In the case of ACH debit, that is likely a business, "pulling" funds from the bank account of a customer, and in the case of ACH credit, this is likely a customer, "pushing" funds from their bank account to the business's.

The originator gives their instructions to their bank, or originating depository financial institution (ODFI). The ODFI either credits or debits their customer's account, depending on the flow, and forwards the transaction to an ACH operator.

The Federal Reserve's FedACH and The Clearing House Payments Company's privately owned Electronic Payments Network (EPN) are the two ACH operators in the United States.

The operator routes the transaction to the receiving depository financial institution (RDFI). As there are just two operators in the US, if the ODFI and RDFI do not use the same ACH operator, the ODFI's operator routes the transaction to the RDFI's operator, who routes it to the RDFI.

The RDFI then either debits or credits (depending on the flow) the bank account of its own customer.

== Types of ACH settlements ==
There are two types of ACH settlements.

=== Next-day ACH ===
ACH debits and credits are transactions that are created, batched, and transmitted to an ACH operator, typically by way of a financial institution's connection to the ACH Network.

With next-day ACH, each ACH transaction is cleared overnight. The sending institution (called the Originating Depository Financial Institution) sends the transaction to the receiving institution (called the Receiving Depository Financial Institution). When the receiving institution receives the transaction, it has until the end of the next working day to send a rejection to the sending institution. If the sending institution does not receive a return from the receiving institution by the morning of the third business day, then the transaction is deemed to be successful.

Waiting for a timeout for two business days is an antiquated feature of ACH that lingers on from the 1960s when the ACH system was designed and implemented. It is not as quick as real-time payment networks. Consequently, ACH debit or credit transactions can take four working days to complete.

=== Same-day ACH ===
With same-day ACH, settlement can happen the same day. The sending institution can transmit files to the receiving institution the same day, expediting the processing of ACH transactions. The receiving institution still has two business days in which to send a return, so there will still be a delay of two business days in same-day ACH debit transactions. On the other hand, ACH credit transactions can be credited on the same business day as long as the receiving institution receives the ACH transaction within the correct window.

Transactions exceeding $1,000,000 and international transactions are not eligible for same-day ACH.

Nacha instituted same-day ACH in four phases. As of September 15, 2017, banks were required to accept debit requests in the same three settlement windows. As of September 23, 2016, financial institutions were required to be able to process ACH credit requests to add funds to an account in all three settlement windows. As of March 16, 2018, banks were required to make funds available as fully settled completed transactions by 5:00 p.m. local time for ACH credit transactions processed in the day's first two settlement windows. As of March 20, 2020, the per-transaction limit was raised from $25,000 to $100,000. It was again raised to $1,000,000 as of March 18, 2022.

== SEC codes ==
Common Standard Entry Class (SEC) codes are as follows.

Code	Name	Description
ARC	Accounts Receivable Conversion	A consumer check converted to a one-time ACH debit. The difference between an Accounts Receivable Conversion and Point of Purchase is that an Accounts Receivable Conversion may result from a check received by mail, whereas Point of Purchase must have been received in-person.
BOC	Back Office Conversion	A single-entry debit, initiated either at the point-of-purchase or at a staffed bill-payment location, to transfer funds through conversion to an ACH debit entry during back-office processing. Unlike Accounts Receivable Conversion entries, a Back Office Conversion requires that the customer be present and that the vendor post a notice that checks may be converted to Back Office Conversion ACH entries.
CCD	Corporate Credit or Debit Entry	Used to consolidate and sweep cash funds within an entity's controlled accounts, or make/collect payments to/from other corporate entities.
CIE	Customer Initiated Entries	Use is limited to credit applications where the consumer initiates the transfer of funds to a company for payment of funds owed to that company, typically through some type of home-banking product or bill payment service provider.
CTX	Corporate Trade Exchange	Transactions that include ASC X12 or EDIFACT information.
DNE	Death Notification Entry	Issued by the federal government.
IAT	International ACH Transaction	This is a SEC code for cross-border payment traffic to replace the PBR and CBR codes. The code has been implemented since September 18, 2009.
POP	Point of Purchase	A check presented in-person to a merchant for purchase is presented as an ACH entry instead of a physical check.
POS	Point of Sale	A debit at an electronic terminal initiated by use of a plastic card. An example is using a debit card to purchase gas.
PPD	Prearranged Payment and Deposits	Used to credit or debit a consumer account. Popularly used for payroll direct deposits and preauthorized bill payments.
RCK	Represented Check Entries	When a physical check was presented and then returned because of insufficient funds, it may be represented as an ACH entry.
TEL	Telephone-Initiated Entry	Oral authorization by telephone to issue an ACH entry, such as checks by phone. While a Telephone-Initiated Entry is allowed for all inbound telephone orders, it is allowed outbound telephone solicitations only if a prior business arrangement with the customer has already been established.
WEB	Web-Initiated Entry	Electronic authorization through the Internet in order to create an ACH entry.
XCK	Destroyed Check Entry	If a physical check was destroyed because of a disaster, it can be presented as an ACH entry.

== Regulation ==
The ACH network is governed by a myriad of rules and regulations mandated by various parties. Firstly, participants are bound by the rules of the National Automated Clearinghouse Association (Nacha), as well as by the direct regulatory oversight of the Federal Reserve Bank regulations such as Electronic Fund Transfer Act and Operating Circular #4.

Several sections of the Uniform Commercial Code (notably 4 and 4a) also relate to the operation of the automated clearing house.

There also exist rules mandated by the ACH operators that financial institutions are required to follow in order to use those operators.

== See also ==
- Clearing (finance)
- Clearing house (finance)
- Clearing House Association
- Directo a México
- Electronic funds transfer
- National Automated Clearing House
- Originating Depository Financial Institution
- Pan-European automated clearing house
- Universal Payment Identification Code
- Wire transfer
