= Giro (banking) =

Payment transfer from one bank account to another bank account and initiated by the payer

A giro transfer, often shortened to giro (/ˈdʒaɪroʊ, ˈʒɪəroʊ/), is a payment transfer between current bank accounts and initiated by the payer, not the payee. The debit card has a similar model. Giros are primarily used in Europe; although electronic payment systems exist in the United States (e.g., the Automated Clearing House), it is not possible to perform third-party transfers with them. In the European Union, the Single Euro Payments Area (SEPA) allows electronic giro or debit card payments in euros to be executed to any euro bank account in the area.

== Name ==
The word "giro" is borrowed from Dutch giro and/or German giro, which are both from the Italian giro meaning "circulation of money". The Italian term comes via the Latin gyrus meaning "gyre" from the Greek gyros meaning "circle".

== History and concept ==
Giro systems originated in Ptolemaic Egypt in the 4th century BCE, where state granary deposits functioned as an early banking system with a central bank in Alexandria accepting giro payments. Giro was a common method of money transfer in early banking.

The first occurrences of book money are not known exactly. The giro system itself can be traced back to the "bancherii" in Northern Italy, especially on the Rialto (a financial centre, resembling the modern day Wall Street or the City of London). Originally these were money changers sitting at their desk ("bancus" = bench) that customers could turn to. They offered an additional service to keep the money and to allow direct transfer from one money store to another by checking the accounts in their storage books. Literally they opened one book, withdrew an amount, and opened another book where the amount was added. This handling was naturally a very regional system but it allowed the money to circulate in the books. This led finally to the foundation of the "Banco del Giro" in 1619 (in Venetian, "Banco del Ziro") which gave the blueprint for similar banking systems. The usage in German can be seen in the Banco del Giro founded in Vienna in 1703 (to extend the financing business that Samuel Oppenheimer had brought from Venice in 1670).

Postal giro or postgiro systems have a long history in European financial services. The basic concept is that of a banking system not based on cheques, but rather by direct transfer between accounts. If the accounting office is centralised, then transfers between accounts can happen simultaneously. Money could be paid in or withdrawn from the system at any post office, and later connections to the commercial banking systems were established, often simply by the local bank opening its own postgiro account.

By the middle of the 20th century, most countries in continental Europe had a postal giro service. The first postgiro system was established in Austria in the early 19th century. When the British postgiro was conceived in 1968, the Dutch postgiro was very well established with virtually every adult having a postgiro account, and very large and well-used postgiro operations in most other countries in Europe. Banks also adopted the giro as a method of direct payment from remitter to receiver.

The term "bank" was not used initially to describe the service. The banks' main payment instrument was based on the cheque, which has a totally different remittance model from that of a giro.

== Model ==
In the banking model, cheques are written by the paying party and then handed or mailed to the payee, who must then visit a bank or mail the cheque to their bank. The cheque must then be cleared, a complex process by which cheques are sorted once, mailed to a central clearing location, sorted again, and then mailed back to the paying branch, which verifies that the funds are available and pays the payee's bank.

In the postal giro model, the paying party sends a request to pay the payee (called a giro transfer) to the giro centre, which verifies that the funds are available, debits the payer's accounts by the amount requested, and credits that amount to the payee's account. The giro centre then sends the giro transfer document to the payee, and an updated account statement to both the payer and payee. In the case of large utilities receiving thousands of payments per day, statements are sent electronically and incorporate a unique reference number for each payment for reconciliation purposes.

In the United States, the rise of electronic cheque clearing (and debit cards as preferred instruments of payment) has made this difference less important than it once was. In some stores in the United States, checks are scanned at the cash register and handed back to the customer. The scanned information is forwarded to a payment processor, which transfers the money using the ACH Network.

Unlike the banking model, the postal giro model allows an individual to transfer money directly into another individual's bank account, provided the sender has the recipient's account details. The recipient is not required to approve or acknowledge the transfer or visit the bank to claim it. As a result, cheques are rarely used in countries with extensive giro networks, such as Germany, the Netherlands, Belgium and the Nordic countries.

Direct deposit systems such as those in common use in the United States, by contrast, require the recipient's explicit approval, typically provided by filling out a form. Transferring funds from one personal bank account to another typically requires either a physical check or a wire transfer, which may incur a significant fee and require the paying party to visit the bank.

In giro systems, credit risk for currency transfers is borne by operators like banks as interbank credit risk, but not by the payer or payee, unlike with cheques or credit cards. This eliminates the need to evaluate the payer's creditworthiness, as transactions can only be initiated with sufficient funds. However, the lack of credit also means the payer has no protection against dishonest payees, and transactions cannot be recalled or disputed. Fraud is easier in interpersonal transactions, so payments should only be made to trusted parties. Additionally, while intra-bank transfers are fast, interbank transfers may take several days unless both parties use an instant transfer system like the UK's Faster Payments or Canada's Interac e-transfer.

== Electronic bill payment ==
Modern electronic bill payment is similar to the use of giro.

Advantages include:

- Instant access to the funds via an ATM, debit card or cheque card.
- There is no paper cheque that can be lost, stolen, or forgotten.
- Payments made electronically can be less expensive to the payer; typically electronic payments may cost around $0.25 (US) whereas it could cost up to $2 (US) to generate, print and mail a paper cheque. Banks may not even charge for the service at all; for example many banks in the European Union charge nothing for electronic payments inside the SEPA (Single Euro Payments Area), provided the proper BIC and IBAN account numbers are used.
- The payment error rates and subsequent reconciliation issues are significantly reduced.

In the United States, the ACH Network, regulated by NACHA and the Federal Reserve Bank, handles all interbank transfers, including direct deposit and direct debit.

In entirely electronic bill payment, the payer receives a bill—either physically by mail or electronically from a website (electronic billing). Then, the payer reads in the information from the bill, either manually or by using the barcode on the bill (ex: EPC QR Code in the European Union), enters it to the form on the bank website, and submits the form. The payment is immediately deducted from the account balance. This is common in Sweden with giro invoices in the standard formats, which can be scanned by a mobile banking app, have their numbers manually typed in to a web form, or physically presented to a bank in the traditional manner.

== See also ==
- Boleto
- Girobank
- Hawala
- Interac e-Transfer, a similar service in Canada
- Money order
- Paycheck
- Pay stub
- Remittance
