= Convercent =

US software company

- Type: Privately held
- Industry: Governance, Risk Management, and Compliance
- Founded: 2012; 14 years ago
- Founders: Patrick Quinlan and Barclay Friesen
- Headquarters: Denver, Colorado, United States
- Key people: Patrick Quinlan, CEO
- Number of employees: 150 (2021)
- Parent: EQS Group
- Website: www.convercent.com

Convercent is an American software company that helps companies design and implement compliance programs.

The company's governance, risk management and compliance (GRC) software integrates the management of corporate compliance risk, cases, disclosures, training and policies. The company is based in Denver, Colorado and delivers its software using the software as a service model.

== History ==
The company was founded in 2012 by Patrick Quinlan and Barclay Friesen.

In January 2013, Convercent received $10.2 million in funding, led by Azure Capital Partners and Mantucket Capital and with participation from City National Bank.

In October 2013, Convercent raised $10M in Series B funding led by Sapphire Ventures (formerly SAP Ventures), with participation from existing investors Azure Capital Partners, Rho Capital Partners, and Mantucket Capital.

In March 2021, Convercent was acquired by Atlanta-based “trust intelligence” software company OneTrust.

In December 2024 Convercent was sold by OneTrust to EQS Group, a Germany-based provider of corporate compliance and investor relations software.

Convercent has customers in more than 130 countries, including Philip Morris International, CH2M Hill and Under Armour.
