= Risk and compliance =

Risk and compliance may refer to:

- Legal governance, risk management, and compliance
- Governance, risk management, and compliance
- Internal audit
