= Legal Bill Review =

Legal Bill Review (LBR) refers to process of reviewing and analyzing legal bills against any billing guidelines, service level agreements, applicable laws and other generally accepted standards. LBR plays a vital role in litigation spend management through the review and analysis of law firm invoices. LBR is typically accompanied by claims management processes, often outsourced to third parties. LBR is seen as a standard practice among larger insurers and third-party administrators.

== Advantages ==
One of the key advantages of LBR is litigation cost savings by flagging and reducing invoice billing entries against non-compliance with the billing standards. LBR acts as a preventive measure when conducted prior to payment of a legal bill. However, for legal invoices already paid, it acts as measure to recover any excess amount paid to the law firms.

== Outsourcing ==
Considering the high volume of law firm invoices and the need for LBR experts, LBR is often outsourced to third-party service providers, who typically use software. A new and emerging trend in outsourcing is the increasing utilization of machine learning and case management software, which increases the case load that these firms can handle.

== LBR software ==
LBR software applications are utilized for reviewing law firm invoices in electronic format. Typically these software applications are designed to accommodate LEDES and UTBMS standards which prescribes standards for law firm invoices. The LEDES standard is the most prevalent global legal invoice standard.

=== Web-Enabled Attorney Fee Processing System (WAFPS) ===
WAFPS is an online bill review system established by Texas Department of Insurance Division of Workers' Compensation to review and approve invoices for attorney's fees in workers' compensation claims.
