= SCGP =

SCGP may refer to:

- Simons Center for Geometry and Physics
- Supplier Credit Guarantee Program
