= Paycheck =

Payment document for employee wages

An example of a payslip from the John Lewis Partnership, showing gross salary, tax and National Insurance paid and yearly bonus entitlement, among other things

A paycheck (US English) paycheque, or pay cheque (British and Commonwealth English) is traditionally a paper document (cheque) issued by an employer to pay employees for services rendered. In recent times, the physical paycheck has been increasingly replaced by electronic direct deposits to the employee's designated bank account or loaded onto a payroll card. Employees may still receive a pay slip to detail the calculations of the final payment amount.

A salary statement, commonly called a payslip, pay stub, paystub, pay advice, or sometimes paycheck stub or wage slip, is a document received by an employee that either includes a notice that the direct deposit transaction has gone through or that is attached to the paycheck. Each country has laws as to what must be included on a payslip, but this typically includes details of the gross wages for the pay period and the taxes and any other deductions the employer is required to make by law as well as other personal deductions such as retirement plan or pension contributions, insurances, garnishments, or charitable contributions taken out of the gross amount to arrive at the final net amount of the pay, also including the year to date totals in some circumstances.

== Electronic paychecks ==
In most countries with a developed wire transfer system, payment of wages and salaries is increasingly being effected by electronic means, rather than by the use of a physical check. This saves the company money on printing and processing checks and reduce the problem of fraud. However, vocabulary referring to the figurative "paycheck" persists in some languages, but this commonly refers to a payslip or stub rather than an actual check. Some company payrolls have eliminated both the paper check and stub, in which case an electronic image of the stub is available on a website. Most of the provinces and territories in Canada allow employers to issue electronic payslips if the employees have confidential access to it and are able to print it.

== Payroll card ==
For employees that do not have access to a personal bank account, most major payroll service providers can arrange for the net pay of an employee to be loaded onto a payroll card, which is a plastic card similar to a debit card. A payroll card functions like a debit card and allows an employee to access their pay. A payroll card is typically less convenient than cashing a paper paycheck, because the card can be used at participating automatic teller machines to withdraw cash (which usually requires the employee to pay a hefty fee to access their own money and always have daily limits for how much of their own money an employee can access daily) or in stores to make purchases. Most payroll cards will charge a fee if used at an ATM more than once per pay period.

The payroll card account may be held as a single bank account in the employer's name. In that case, the bank account holds the payroll funds for all employees of that company using the payroll card system, and an intermediary limits each employee's draw to an amount specified by the company for a specified pay period. Some payroll card programs establish a separate account for each employee. Most payroll card accounts in the United States are insured by the Federal Deposit Insurance Corporation.

Before a company can give a payroll card to a worker, the business must first contract with a payroll card program manager. The payroll card company performs required "know-your-customer" due diligence as a condition of accepting the application.

In the United States, payroll cards are regulated by state wage-and-hour-laws and by a variety of federal laws including the Electronic Funds Transfer Act and the Consumer Financial Protection Act.

Businesses may elect to use a payroll card program in order to reduce payroll expense. According to Visa, it costs an employer about 35 cents to issue pay electronically but two dollars to write a paper paycheck.

== Payroll warrants ==
Payroll warrants look like checks and clear through the banking system like checks and are therefore often called paychecks by their recipients. But they are not checks because they are not drawn against a checking account. Instead they are drawn against "available funds" that are not in a bank account so the issuer can delay redemption. In the U.S., warrants are issued by government entities such as the military and state and county governments for payroll to individuals and for accounts payable to vendors. Deposited warrants are routed to a collecting bank which processes them as collection items like maturing treasury bills and presents the warrants to the government entity's treasury department for payment each business day.

In the UK, warrants are issued as payment by National Savings and Investments when a premium bond is chosen.
