= Snap Finance =

American financial technology company

- Type: Private
- Industry: Financial services
- Founded: 2012
- Founder: Matt Hawkins
- Headquarters: West Valley City, Utah, United States
- Key people: Ted Saunders (CEO)
- Products: Lease-to-own financing
- Services: Retail financing and consumer financial services
- Number of employees: 900+
- Website: https://snapfinance.com

Snap Finance is an American financial technology company headquartered in West Valley City, Utah.

== History ==
American entrepreneur Matt Hawkins founded Snap Finance in 2012. The company initially offered virtual rent-to-own financing.

By the late 2010s, Snap Finance reported partnering with thousands of retail stores and expanding its platform to support retail installment contracts and loan products offered through participating partners. In 2019, Snap Finance received investment from the private equity firm Summit Partners.

In late 2023, Snap Finance soft-launched a credit card program, which issued over 100,000 Seen-branded credit cards during the pilot phase.

As of 2025, Snap Finance employed more than 900 people and reported serving more than 8 million customers in the United States and United Kingso, and has generated over $11 billion in reported partner sales.

In 2026, Snap Finance launched Snap Marketplace, a lease-to-own e-commerce platform. The same year, Ted Saunders was named CEO of the company.

== Business model ==
Snap Finance's products serve shoppers and merchants. Snap Finance provides lease-to-own financing through retail stores to consumers with medium and low credit scores. The company buys the item and leases it back to the customer with an option to own. Snap Finance also arranges retail installment contracts and services bank-originated loans. In November 2023, it launched a credit-card brand, Seen, issued by Coastal Community Bank.

== Philanthropic efforts ==
Snap Finance launched Snap Cares in September 2021 to "create, fund, and encourage volunteer opportunities, education, and donation programs to improve the standard of living and quality of life in the places we live and work." Snap Cares has given more than $7 million in monetary and in-kind donations to underserved communities since 2021.

In 2024, the Snap Finance Foundation community grant program awarded donations totaling more than $150,000 to 17 nonprofits, and Snap Finance employees volunteered over 1,400 hours.

In 2026, Snap Cares contributed $3.1 million in donated items and expanded its program to include the U.S., the United Kingdom, and Costa Rica.

== Legal and regulatory issues ==
=== Pennsylvania lawsuit and resolution ===
In May 2023, Snap Finance settled with the Pennsylvania Attorney General over allegations that its marketing and practices violated state consumer protection laws.

Pennsylvania authorities accused Snap Finance of misrepresenting its lease-purchase agreements as short-term "cash payoff" plans while enrolling consumers in 12-month obligations that could carry effective interest rates over 150%. The state's lawsuit also alleged that the company's system allowed store employees to sign agreements on customers' behalf without consent and that Snap Finance obscured payoff amounts and used deceptive collection tactics.

Snap Finance denied wrongdoing but agreed to an $11.4 million settlement, including restitution to consumers. As part of the settlement, Snap Finance committed to clearer disclosures and to refrain from describing its lease-to-own products as "loans" or "credit" in Pennsylvania.

=== CFPB lawsuit and resolution ===
On July 19, 2023, the Consumer Financial Protection Bureau (CFPB) filed a lawsuit against Snap Finance and its affiliates, alleging that the company's lease-to-own financing program was deceiving consumers and in violation of several consumer protection statutes.

The CFPB alleged that Snap Finance's marketing misled customers by advertising a "100-Day Payoff" option without clarifying that, otherwise, the plan lasted 12–18 months, and total payments exceeded the product's price. It further alleged that the company failed to provide required disclosures, improperly used pre-authorized electronic debits, made false threats during collections, and misrepresented customers' rights.

According to the CFPB, these practices violated the Consumer Financial Protection Act's prohibitions on unfair or abusive acts, as well as specific provisions of the Truth in Lending Act (TILA), the Electronic Fund Transfer Act, and the Fair Credit Reporting Act.

Snap Finance's defense argued that its lease-purchase agreements are not "credit" products under federal law, and therefore many of the cited regulations did not apply. In August 2024, the United States District Court for the District of Utah ruled in Snap Finance's favor on several points. The judge granted in part Snap Finance's motion to dismiss the CFPB's case, accepting that the lease-to-own contracts were not subject to certain credit disclosure requirements and consequently throwing out the majority of the CFPB's claims.

In May 2025, the Bureau filed a voluntary notice of dismissal with prejudice, thereby closing the enforcement action and barring re-filing of the same claims. The case ended without an adjudication of liability against Snap Finance, and the CFPB did not publicly explain its reasons for dismissing the remaining claims.
