= Emerging Markets Program =

Program to promote US agricultural exports

The Emerging Markets Program was a U.S. Department of Agriculture (USDA) program to promote U.S. agricultural exports. It was originally titled the Emerging Democracies Program.

The program was originally authorized by the 1990 farm bill (P.L. 101–624) to promote U.S. agricultural exports by providing technical assistance and credits or credit guarantees to emerging democracies annually for fiscal years 1991–95. The funds could be used to establish or provide facilities, services, or U.S. products to improve handling, marketing, storage, or distribution of imported agricultural products. The program initially focused on Central Europe, Eastern Europe and the former Soviet Union.

The 1996 farm bill (P.L. 104–127) reauthorized the program through 2002 and renamed it the Emerging Markets Program; the CRS-86 2002 farm bill (P.L. 107–171) extended it through 2007.

In 1996, the program was retargeted to emerging markets (defined as countries that USDA determines have the potential to provide viable and significant markets for U.S. agricultural products). The law requires the Commodity Credit Corporation (CCC) to make available not less than $1 billion annually of direct credit or credit guarantees to emerging markets for fiscal years 1996–2002, in addition to the amounts authorized for GSM-102 and 103.
