= Supplier Credit Guarantee Program =

Financial protection scheme for US exports

The Supplier Credit Guarantee Program (SCGP) is a US Export Credit Guarantee Program that covers credit terms up to 180 days. The Commodity Credit Corporation (CCC) guarantees a portion (up to 65%) of payments due from foreign buyers under financing that the exporters have extended directly to the buyers. These direct credits must be secured by dollar-denominated promissory notes signed by the importers.

If an importer fails to make any payment as agreed, the exporter or assignee (e.g., a U.S. financial institution) must submit a notice of default. The CCC pays any filed claim for loss, if found to be in good order. The SCGP targets specific U.S. agricultural products, with an emphasis on high-value products and market growth potential.
