= Originating Depository Financial Institution =

Originating Depository Financial Institution or ODFI is a banking term in the United States used in connection with ACH Network (ACH). In the ACH flow, the ODFI acts as the interface between the Federal Reserve or ACH network and the originator of the transaction. The ODFI warrants to the ACH network that the transactions it transmits to the network comply with the rules. The depository institution that is a member of ACH is usually a bank or other financial institution which is initiating a payment on behalf of its client. This is different from check processing in which the paying bank on which the check is drawn warrants that the transaction is in compliance.

== See also ==
- Receiving Depository Financial Institution
