= Electronic funds transfer =

Electronic transfer of money from one bank account to another

Electronic funds transfer (EFT) is the transfer of money from one bank account to another, either within a single financial institution or across multiple institutions, via computer-based systems.

The funds transfer process generally consists of a series of electronic messages sent between financial institutions directing each to make the debit and credit accounting entries necessary to complete the transaction. An electronic funds transfer starts when the sending customer send an electronic instruction with the purpose of making payment to the beneficiary or the receiving customer.

== Process ==
According to the United States Electronic Fund Transfer Act of 1978 it is "a funds transfer initiated through an electronic terminal, telephone, computer (including on-line banking) or magnetic tape for the purpose of ordering, instructing, or authorizing a financial institution to debit or credit a consumer's account".

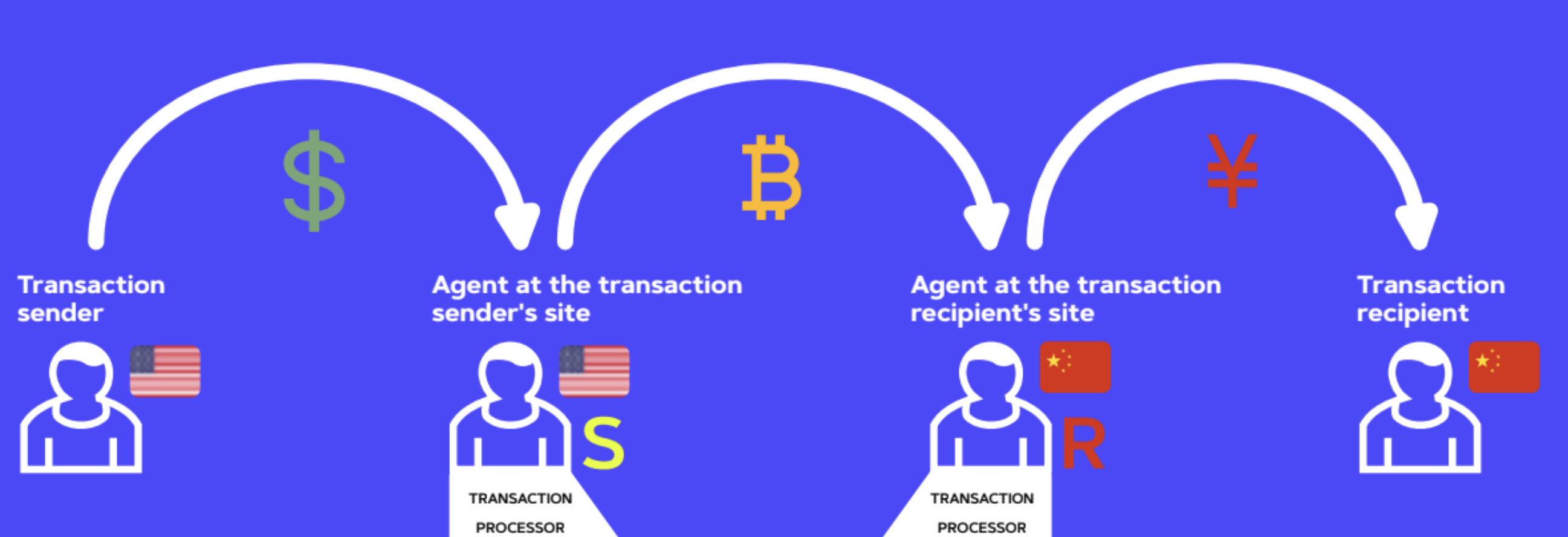
Funds Transfer example

EFT transactions are known by a number of names across countries and different payment systems. For example, in the United States, they may be referred to as "electronic checks" or "e-checks". In the United Kingdom, the term "BACS Payment", "bank transfer" and "bank payment" are used, in Canada, "e-Transfer" is used, while in several European countries "giro transfer" is the common term.

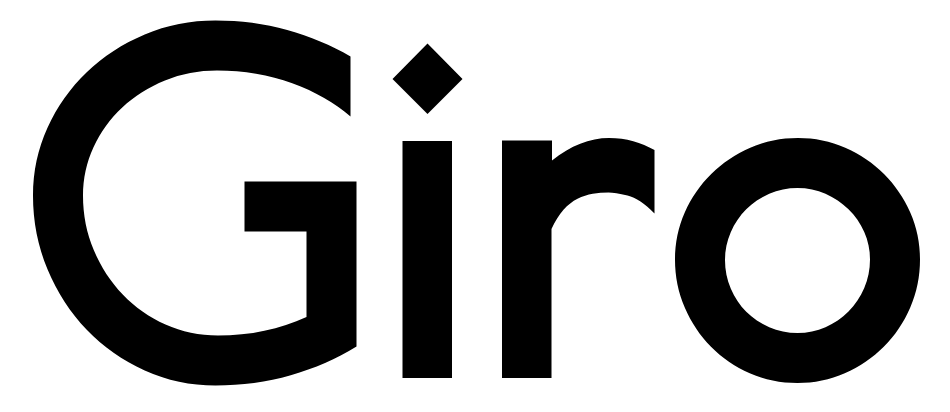
GiroApp

== Types ==
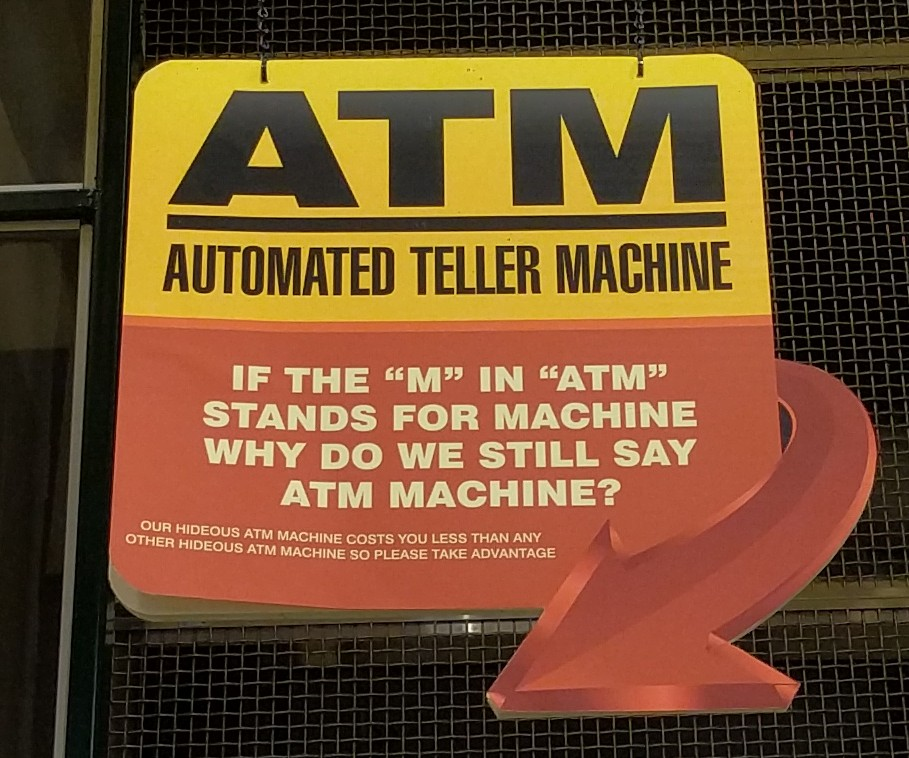
ATM

Electronic Funds Transfer (EFT) is an umbrella term that refers to a number of different transfer methods:

- Automated Clearing House (ACH) payments processed through the ACH network and not through traditional card networks. Not all EFT payments are processed through the ACH network, but all ACH payments are EFTs
- Automated teller machine (ATM) transfers
- Direct deposit payment or withdrawals of funds initiated by the payer
- Direct debit payments in which a business debits the consumer's bank accounts for payment for goods or services
- Electronic bill payment in online banking, which may be delivered by EFT or paper check
- QR code payment is a payment initiated using a QR Code scanned from POS terminal or Digital wallet
- Transfers initiated by telephone (Mail Order/Telephone Order)
- Electronic funds transfer at point of sale (EFTPOS) are transfers resulting from credit or debit card transactions initiated through a payment terminal
- Web/Internet Online Payments (E-commerce payment system)
- Wire transfer via an international banking network such as Society for Worldwide Interbank Financial Telecommunication (SWIFT)
- Real-time Payments

== See also ==
- E-commerce
- Interbank network
- Payment system
- Real time gross settlement (RTGS)
