= NACHA =

American payment system organization

Nacha
- Founded: June 20, 1974
- Type: Not-for-profit
- Tax ID no.: 23-7451693
- Legal status: 501(c)(6)
- Location: Herndon, Virginia, United States
- Services: Financial services trade association
- Members: 500+
- President, chief executive officer: Jane Larimer
- Revenue: $23,616,643 (2019)
- Expenses: $22,046,071 (2019)
- Employees: 70 (2019)
- Volunteers: 100 (2019)
- Website: www.nacha.org

Nacha, originally the National Automated Clearinghouse Association, manages the ACH Network, the backbone for the electronic movement of money and data in the United States, and is an association for the payments industry. The ACH Network serves as a network for direct consumer, business, and government payments, and annually facilitates billions of payments such as Direct Deposit and Direct Payment. The ACH Network is governed by the Nacha Operating Rules.

In 2022, the Nacha through its ACH network handled 30.00 billion payments (3.03% year-over-year (YoY) gain), totaling US$76.7 trillion (5.6% YoY gain). From 2013-22, overall gain in the volume of transactions was 70.95%, or 5.51% annualized. The 2013-22 overall gain of the value of the transactions was 98.25%, or 7.08% annualized.

Nacha is a not-for-profit association under the Internal Revenue Service code 501(c)(6) and was incorporated in 1974. It represents more than 9,000 financial institutions divided into ten regional payments associations and direct membership. Nacha is not directly involved in the ACH transactions, but develops rules and standards and provides education, accreditation, and advisory services.

== History and organization ==
In 1972, the California Automated Clearing House Association (now called WesPay) was formed, becoming the first operational ACH association in the United States.

After two years, other regional ACH associations were formed. The associations came together in 1974 to create Nacha, which was tasked with developing, governing and administering the ACH Network. While Nacha governs the ACH Network, it does not operate the physical ACH Network; the processing of transactions is handled by the Federal Reserve and The Clearing House Payments Company (also known as EPN).

Originally part of the American Bankers Association, Nacha separated in 1985 and hired Bill Moroney as its first chief executive officer. He was succeeded in 1988 by Elliott McEntee. Upon McEntee's retirement in 2008, Janet O. Estep became Nacha's president and CEO. In 2019, Jane Larimer became Nacha's president and CEO.

== Leadership ==
Nacha’s board of directors are representatives of depository financial institutions who are tasked with overseeing the governance and administration of Nacha as ACH Network administrator and industry association.

The 2022 board of directors:

- Joe W. Hussey, managing director, North America Payables and Receivables Product Executive, J.P. Morgan Chase & Co., chairperson
- Laura J. Listwan, AAP, CTP, senior vice president, head of commercial payments products and service, Fifth Third Bank, vice chairperson
- John E. Lucas, CCM, treasury and payments solutions director of product management and development, Synovus Financial Corporation, secretary and treasurer
- Jane Larimer, president and chief executive officer, Nacha
- Jeanine M. Andol-Moeller, CCM, group vice president, M&T Bank
- Marlene Barkheimer, president and chief executive officer, Farmers State Bank
- Sarah T. Billings, senior vice president, head of payments product, operations and strategy, treasury management, PNC Bank
- Lisa S. Coffey, chief innovation officer, Corporate America Credit Union
- Elizabeth A. Cronenweth, AAP, CCM, senior vice president, payments group product manager, UMB Bank, N.A.
- Nicholas J. Drinkwine, APRP, head of transaction operations, Varo Bank, N.A.
- Vikram Israni, chief financial officer, Wings Financial Credit Union
- Tina M. Knapp, CPA, vice president and director, payments and service support, ESL Federal Credit Union
- Stephen C. Max, executive vice president, head of operations services, U.S. Bank
- AJ McCray, managing director, head of global corporate payments, Bank of America, N.A.
- Tim Mills, senior vice president, emerging payments, Regions Bank
- Philip C. Picillo, Esq., CTP, senior vice president, treasury and payment solutions, Webster Bank
- Christopher E. Richards, APRP, executive vice president, chief banking services officer, The Cape Cod Five Cents Savings Bank
- William J. Schoch, president and chief executive officer, Wespay
- Carl Slabicki, AAP, CTP, managing director, treasury services, BNY Mellon
- Michelle E. Ziolkowski, CTP, senior vice president, head of global payables, Wells Fargo

The ACH operator advisor representatives to the board:

- Jason Carone, AAP, APRP, CTP, senior vice president, ACH product management, The Clearing House
- Keith Melton, head of product and strategy management, Retail Payments Office, Federal Reserve Bank of Atlanta

== Initiatives ==
=== ACH payments ===
The ACH Network processes payments. ACH payments can be sent as either “same-day,” “next-day,” or “2-day” – and Same Day ACH payments can be initiated and completed within a single day and as fast as a matter of hours.

=== Direct deposit ===
Nacha's establishment led to the first ACH rules being drafted, and that in turn paved the way for the very first type of ACH transactions, known as Direct Deposit. The U.S. Air Force became the first employer in the nation to initiate a Direct Deposit payroll program. Direct Deposit is the way nearly 94 percent of Americans get paid.

=== COVID-19 Economic Impact Payments ===
In March 2020, the Coronavirus Aid, Relief, and Economic Security Act provided Economic Impact Payments (EIP) up to $1,200 per adult and $500 per child. The federal government sent hundreds of millions of EIPs by direct deposit.

=== Quest rules for EBT ===
Nacha wrote and administers the Quest Operating Rules for Electronic Benefits Transfer (EBT) which have been in place since 1996. These rules enable the distribution of government benefits regardless of state borders. Government entities incorporate the rules in their contracts with private sector service providers. Nacha also develops additional standards for related programs.

=== Standards for ACA payments ===
Under the administrative simplification provisions of the Affordable Care Act, Nacha was designated by the United States Department of Health & Human Services as the standards development organization (SDO) for healthcare Electronic Funds Transfer (EFT). The Healthcare Electronic Funds Transfer (EFT) standard supports electronic claim payments and remittance information between health plans and health care providers, accelerating cash flow and simplifying reconciliation for providers. Nacha's CCD+Addenda payment (a business-to-business payment with one addenda record of remittance information) is the standard for healthcare EFT transactions. Under the ACA's administrative simplification framework, health plans are required to pay claims using the standard EFT transaction, whenever requested by healthcare, medical or dental practices. In 2018, more than 306.7 million ACH EFT payments, valued at $1.59 trillion, were made from health plans to healthcare providers. In the second quarter of 2021, health processed 108 million EFTs, up almost 36% from the same 2020 period. Today, 84% of providers prefer EFT from payers.

=== Phixius ===
On 12 August 2020, Nacha reported that Visa has entered a growing list of collaborators piloting Phixius. Phixius is a Nacha-built and managed business that uses technologies, structured APIs and rules to allow interoperability in a secure network of linked credentialed service providers (CSPs) for the protected exchange of payment related details. In 2022, Phixius forecasts 1 million transactions, reaching more than 1,700 financial institutions and 7,000 businesses.

== Membership ==
Nacha has more than 500 members, and offers the following membership categories.

Nacha direct member

Nacha direct members are financial institutions and payments associations, and are active participants in educating and advocating for the ACH Network with regulators, legislators, and other stakeholder organizations whose policies affect the payments system. As Direct Members, these entities vote on amendments to the Nacha Operating Rules.

Payments Innovation Alliance

The Payments Innovation Alliance is a membership group of domestic and international organizations who develop new ideas and initiatives to advance the electronic payments industry.

Nacha Affiliate Program

The Affiliate Program is an information-only membership option that gives access to resources on the ACH Network and the Nacha Operating Rules.

== Education ==
Nacha provides educational programs to its members and the financial services industry. These programs include:

Smarter Faster Payments Conference

Smarter Faster Payments is an annual conference for the financial industry, which includes an exhibit hall, education events and networking opportunities. Payments Remote Connect is the virtual option for those who are unable to attend the conference in person.

Payments Institute

The Payments Institute is an in-person academic program where students build their own curriculum from five schools of study, two master’s programs, and lecture halls. TPI Homeschool is a virtual option for the Payments Institute.

PaymentsIQ by Nacha

PaymentsIQ by Nacha is a subscription-based education platform offering on-demand, virtual payments education content.

ACH Legal and Compliance Summit

ACH Legal and Compliance Summit is a program founded in 2021. The Summit serves to provide attendees with the knowledge necessary in ACH compliance and regulations in the payments industry to protect clients and organizations.

== Accreditation ==
Nacha offers accreditation programs for financial industry professionals and organizations, including the Accredited ACH Professional (AAP) and the Accredited Payments Risk Professional (APRP) accreditations.

Accredited ACH Professional

The Accredited ACH Professional (AAP) is a professional certification designating that an individual has demonstrated a comprehensive knowledge of all areas of ACH, a deep understanding of and experience in one or more specific ACH subjects, and a broad knowledge of concepts that relate to the payments system.

Accredited Payments Risk Professional

The Accredited Payments Risk Professional (APRP) is a professional certification designating that an individual has demonstrated a comprehensive knowledge of risk management strategies, concepts, and mitigation techniques within the payments ecosystem, while mastering the complexities of risk management for ACH, check, wire, debit, credit, and prepaid cards, and emerging and alternative payments.

== Acquisitions and partnerships ==
In March 2018, Nacha acquired the Interactive Financial eXchange Forum (IFX). In September 2018, Nacha launched Afinis Interoperability Standards, a membership-based standards organization, to develop interoperable, portable financial services standards. IFX Forum is a part of Afinis Interoperability Standards.

Nacha announced it had acquired the Business Payments Directory Association in October 2018. BPD supports business-to-business (B2B) payment services, including blockchain-based B2B transactions.

== See also ==
- ACH Network
- Automated Clearing House
- Electronic funds transfer
- National Automated Clearing House
