= Interac e-Transfer =

Canadian money transfer service

- Formerly: Interac Email Money Transfer
- Industry: Funds transfers
- Founded: 2003
- Headquarters: Canada
- Parent: Interac Corporation
- Website: interac.ca/en/interac-e-transfer-consumer

Interac e-Transfer (formerly Interac Email Money Transfer or EMT) is a Canadian funds transfer service between personal and business accounts in participating Canadian banks and other financial institutions, offered through Interac Corporation.

From inception in 2003 until early 2018, the service was provided by Acxsys, a for-profit consortium backed by most of the major partners of the nonprofit Interac Association, and using the Interac brand under licence. In February 2018, the activities of both organizations were combined into a single for-profit organization under the Interac name.

== Participating institutions ==
Most Canadians who use online banking can send funds. These include personal deposit account holders with the big five banks (Bank of Montreal, Scotiabank, CIBC, RBC, and TD), Desjardins, Tangerine, National Bank, Simplii, PC Financial, EQ Bank and many credit unions and other institutions, as well as some small-business account holders. In 2015, 105 million money transfers were sent using the platform totalling over CA$44 billion in value.

Any personal account holder in Canada can receive funds.

== Process ==
An e-Transfer resembles an e-cheque in many respects. The money is not actually transferred by e-mail. Only the instructions to retrieve the funds are.

The sender opens an online banking session and chooses the recipient, the amount to send, as well as a security question and answer. The funds are debited instantly, usually for a surcharge. If the recipient cannot be assumed to know the answer to the security question, the sender must communicate it separately.

An e-mail or text message is then sent to the recipient, with instructions on how to retrieve the funds and answer the question, via a secure website.

The recipient must answer the security question correctly. (If the recipient fails to answer the question correctly after three tries, then the funds will automatically be returned to sender.)

If the recipient is subscribed to online banking at one of the participating institutions, the funds are deposited instantly at no extra charge.

If the recipient's deposit account is not at one of the participating institutions or not subscribed to online banking at all, the funds are deposited within three to five business days, and a surcharge (currently $4.00) is deducted from the amount received.

The Autodeposit feature allows senders to send money and be received by the recipient without the recipient having to answer a security question. The recipient must enable this feature in their account settings. Not all banks offer this feature.

When an e-Transfer has not been accepted after a certain period of time, the transfer will not go through. The transfer duration depends on the bank and/or the person's settings. Some e-Transfers can be automatically cancelled after 24 hours or after a period of up to 30 days, depending on the bank / the user. Banks like TD, CIBC, and RBC have a set 30-day limit until an e-Transfer is cancelled, while other banks have shorter durations and set limits.

== Benefits and disadvantages ==
Unlike a cheque, the funds from an e-Transfer are not frozen in the recipient's account. An e-Transfer cannot bounce, as the funds are guaranteed, having been debited from the sender's account immediately upon initiating the transfer. As long as both sender and recipient bank are participating institutions, the funds are sent and received instantly. However, in some cases, for example two people with different banking institutions, transfers may take anywhere between near instant, or up to a few hours for the receiving party to get their emailed notice.

However, like any online banking mode of payment, e-Transfers are vulnerable to phishing. Many Canadians in areas where the Big Five banks have little presence or who do not bank online are penalized by a surcharge when receiving e-Transfers. Unlike a real giro, an e-Transfer requires intervention from the recipient for every single transaction, unless the recipient has signed up for Autodeposit. An e-Transfer goes stale much more quickly than a cheque (after 30 days, the e-Transfer is automatically cancelled, and the sender is notified by e-mail to retrieve the funds).

== Security and privacy issues ==
In 2019 several articles published by Erica Johnson (CBC News) reported that e-Transfers had been intercepted and/or redirected via different means such as guessing security questions or impersonating e-Transfer customers. In many cases, the customers were not reimbursed. In the same year, a paper published on arxiv.org examined the security and privacy of Interac e-Transfer and came to the conclusion that "Standard e-Transfers are potentially insecure against redirections" and that "the platform fails to protect its customers' privacy" due to relying on technologies such as e-mail and SMS.

== See also ==
- Electronic funds transfer
