= Intermediate Export Credit Guarantee Program =

Agriculture CCC intermediate program

The Intermediate Export Credit Guarantee Program (GSM-103) is one of the Commodity Credit Corporation (CCC) Export Credit Guarantee programs.

While the Export Credit Guarantee Program (GSM-102) guarantees credit terms up to 3 years, the Intermediate Export Credit Guarantee Program (GSM-103) guarantees longer term credits up to 10 years. Under these programs, the CCC guarantees payments due from foreign banks—typically, 98% of principal and a portion of interest at an adjustable rate. Because repayment is guaranteed, U.S. financial institutions can offer credit on competitive terms to foreign banks, usually with interest rates based on the LIBOR. (GSM-102/103).
