= Directo a México =

Directo a México is a program launched in 2005 and operated by the Federal Reserve and Banco de Mexico, the central banks of the United States and Mexico, respectively. The program allows commercial banks and credit unions in the U.S. to transfer money through FedACH, the Federal Reserve's clearinghouse, which is linked to Banco de Mexico.
