= Billback =

Accounting service or suite of software that is used for cost recovery

Billback or bill back is an accounting service or suite of software that is used for cost recovery.

With a billback system, the client or payer is charged a low initial fee, basically a percentage of the total cost of equipment, services, and venues, but is later billed back additional fees, which usually show up in the month after the transaction occurred. Billback systems track usage from concert halls to toothpicks, add the costs up, divide it all out, and calculate the price per usage by hours, minutes, seconds, pieces, visits, clicks, views etc.

Computerized billback systems are useful for occasions that were traditionally difficult to keep track of and where costs were covered with a blanket revenue. By tracking usage, running costs of equipment such as copy machines and phones can be precisely attributed, and their initial costs may be recovered with more certainty. The ROI can be calculated more accurately. This, in turn, assists in making future investment choices.
