= Short Term Export Credit Guarantee Program =

The Short Term Export Credit Guarantee Program (GSM-102) is one of the Commodity Credit Corporation (CCC) export credit guarantee programs. (GSM-102) covers credit terms up to three years. It underwrites credit extended by the private banking sector in the United States (or, less commonly, by the U.S. exporter) to approved foreign banks using dollar-denominated, irrevocable letters of credit to pay for food and agricultural products sold to foreign buyers.

== See also ==
Intermediate Export Credit Guarantee Program
