= Legal Electronic Data Exchange Standard =

The Legal Electronic Data Exchange Standard is a set of file format specifications intended to facilitate electronic data transmission in the legal industry. The phrase is abbreviated LEDES and is usually pronounced as "leeds". The LEDES specifications are maintained by the LEDES Oversight Committee (LOC), which started informally as an industry-wide project led by the Law Firm and Law Department Services Group within PricewaterhouseCoopers in 1995. In 2001, the LEDES Oversight Committee was incorporated as a California mutual-benefit nonprofit corporation and is now led by a seven-member Board of Directors.

The LOC maintains four types of data exchange standards for legal electronic billing (ebilling); budgeting; timekeeper attributes; and intellectual property matter management.

The LOC also maintains five types of data elements in the LEDES data exchange standards: Uniform Task-Based Management System codes, which classify the work performed by type of legal matter; activity codes, which classify the actual work performed; expense codes, which classify the type of expense incurred; timekeeper classification codes; and error codes, which assist law firms with understanding invoice validation errors.

The LOC has also created an API that allows for system-to-system transmission of legal invoices from law firms and other legal vendors required by their clients to ebill, to the third-party ebilling systems. Other functionality is also supported in this very complex standard, which is intended to ease the burden at the law firm for managing client-required ebilling.

== Electronic billing formats ==
The electronic billing data exchange format types provide a standard data format for electronically transmitted invoices, typically from a law firm to a corporate client. The LEDES e-billing format currently has the following variations:

- LEDES 1998, the first "LEDES" format, created in 1998, but no longer in use. The format does not appear on www.LEDES.org.
- LEDES 1998B, a pipe-delimited plain text file. The standard was adopted in 1998, and it is the more commonly used LEDES format in the US. It lacks flexibility, having a rigid structure, and does not support taxes on legal fees. Another disadvantage of LEDES 1998B is that invoice-level data is repeated on every line item even though it is only needed once, as it does not vary per line. Many clients attempt to impose nonstandard customizations, thus defeating the purpose of having a standard. Nonetheless, US-based law firms prefer it for its simplicity and familiarity.
- LEDES XML 2000, adopted in 2000, is an older XML format that uses a DTD. In LEDES 2000, although the structure is well defined, the specification defines "extend" segments, allowing the insertion of client-specific fields without breaking the format or violating the standard. The format is no longer supported by the LEDES Oversight Committee and information on the format will be removed from www.LEDES.org on February 1, 2024.
- LEDES 1998BI (international), a pipe-delimited plain text file, proposed in 2004 by the Legal IT Innovators Group (LITIG) and ratified by the LEDES Oversight Committee in 2006. Based on the LEDES 1998B standard, it includes all of the fields in the LEDES 1998B format, plus additional ones. This format was designed to accommodate legal bills generated outside of the United States and allows for one tax per line item.
- LEDES XML 2.0, an XML format that uses XSD. It was ratified in 2006 and addresses international needs in XML format. Unlike earlier LEDES formats, XML 2.0 represents the nature of the financial transaction between the parties. It supports multiple taxes on line-items and provides AFA Support. It contains 15 segments and 156 data elements.
- LEDES XML 2.1, ratified in 2008. It contains all of the data points in XML 2.0, plus additional segments and data elements to provide: enhanced tax functionality with support for Withholding and Credit Notes; and invoice-level global extensibility. It contains 16 segments and 194 data elements.
- LEDES XML 2.2, ratified in 2020. It contains all of the data points in XML 2.1, plus additional segments and data elements to support tiered taxes. It contains 18 segments and 206 data elements.

== Other data exchange formats ==
The other LEDES data exchange formats are as follows:

- LEDES Budget was ratified in 2006. This XML format facilitates the exchange of budget data between law firms and clients.
- LEDES Timekeeper Attribute was ratified in 2007 and revised in 2014. This XML format used to transmit timekeeper and rate data to from law firms to clients.
- IPMM Invention Disclosure Standard was ratified in 2015. This is a set of XML schemas that can validate an XML document containing invention disclosure data.

== UTBMS ==
The Uniform Task-Based Management System is a widely used system for coding legal work.

In April 2006, the UTBMS Update Initiative voted to merge into the LEDES Oversight Committee. Shortly thereafter, the LEDES Oversight Committee established www.UTBMS.com as the global reference for all known UTBMS standards, regardless of the organization that established the standard.

== LEDES Error Codes - Version 2 ==
In 2020, the LEDES Oversight Committee (LOC) ratified Version 1 of the LEDES Error Codes, which aimed to establish a standardized framework for identifying errors in electronic billing (e-billing) submissions. In September 2024, Version 1 was fully updated and replaced by Version 2, which was ratified by the LEDES Board. This new version continues the mission of standardizing the identification of errors in e-billing submissions across different systems and clients.

Why LEDES Error Codes?

The introduction of LEDES Error Codes addresses a longstanding issue expressed by many law firm members. Prior to the standardization, law firms and corporate legal departments spent significant time tracking down errors caused by non-standardized and often unintelligible error messages in e-billing submissions. These error messages gave little indication of what needed to be fixed, resulting in wasted hours and inefficient workflows.

The standardized Error Codes are designed to make e-billing error identification more consistent and easier to understand, which will help reduce the time law firms, corporate legal departments, and software vendors spend on correcting billing errors. The hope is that the implementation of these standardized error codes across the industry will streamline the billing process and reduce the administrative burden on legal teams, ultimately enhancing the efficiency of legal billing practices.

== 2024 LEDES Oversight Committee Board of Directors ==
The 2024 Board of Directors of the LEDES Oversight Committee (LOC) plays a critical role in overseeing the development and implementation of LEDES standards, including the new version of the LEDES Error Codes. The following individuals serve on the 2024 LOC Board:

President: Jane A. Bennitt, Global Legal Ebilling, LLC Vice President: Cathrine J. Collins, Legal Systems Automation, LLC Treasurer/Membership: Jim Hannigan, Coblentz Patch Duffy & Bass LLP Standards: David Nelson, Pathfinder eConsulting Limited Secretary: Nadia Strobbia, Elite Regional Groups: Andrew Dey, Andrew Dey Limited Marketing: Inemesit Edet, Smart eBill Team

== See also ==
- Electronic data interchange (EDI)
- Expense and cost recovery system (ECRS)
- Extract, transform, load (ETL)
