= Governance, risk, and compliance =

Organizational concept

Governance, risk, and compliance (GRC) is a holistic approach to governance, risk management, and regulatory compliance, used by companies, governments, and other organizations to ensure they meet regulatory requirements while running their operations effectively. This approach was developed in the 2000s for managing increasingly complex financial compliance requirements, and organizations also use it for addressing technical, environmental, and health and safety requirements. Contemporary trends in the field include the growing implementation of Environmental, social and governance criteria, boardroom diversity and the use of Artificial Intelligence.

== History ==
Corporate financial scandals in the 1970s in the United States led to the creation of the organization, the Committee of Sponsoring Organizations of the Treadway Commission (COSO), by major US accounting associations; COSO issued reports calling for better controls over financial accounting, and standards to achieve those controls.

Call for more strict internal controls and financial reporting standards for companies was driven by high-profile corporate scandals in the 1990s in the United Kingdom leading to the Turnbull Report, as well as similar scandals in the United States in the early 2000s, such as the Enron scandal leading the passage of the Sarbanes–Oxley Act. COSO updated their standards accordingly.

As companies began efforts to comply with these regulations, the interconnectedness of governance, risk management, and compliance became clear. This created a market for training and software to bring these function together; for example, in 2002, Symbiant, a British software development company, created the first GRC software that let teams work together online, combining risk registers, evaluations and audit tracking all in one system. The term "Governance, risk, and compliance" or "GRC" was published by Scott Mitchell, founder of the Open Compliance and Ethics Group (OCEG), in an academic paper in 2007.

== Overview ==
Governance, risk, and compliance (GRC) are three related facets that aim to assure an organization reliably achieves objectives, addresses uncertainty and acts with integrity. Corporate governance is the combination of processes established and executed by the directors which shape the organization's structure and assigns roles, enterprise risk management is predicting and managing risks that could hinder an organization from reliably achieving its objectives under uncertainty. Compliance refers to adhering with the mandated boundaries of laws and regulations as well as voluntary boundaries including company policy and procedures

The discipline aims to synchronize information and activity across governance, and compliance in order to operate more efficiently, enable effective information sharing, more effectively report activities and avoid wasteful overlaps. If not integrated and instead tackled in a traditional "silo" approach, most organizations must sustain unmanageable numbers of GRC-related requirements due to changes in technology, increasing data storage, market globalization and increased regulation.

Specific fields have developed GRC approaches, including Financial GRC, Legal GRC, and Operational GRC.

== Frameworks ==
Various frameworks have been developed in order to aid organizations in implementing the principles of GRC to their operations and structure.

=== COSO Enterprise Risk Management Framework ===
Commissioned by COSO, this framework seeks to deter fraud by allowing organizations to better measure and manage risk. It expands the concept of internal control by making risk management a core part of strategic planning and the setting of objectives within an organization.

The model is structured around twenty core principles organized into five components:

1. Governance and Culture: includes the principles of Exercising board risk oversight, Establishing operating structures, Defining desired culture, Demonstrating commitment to core values and Attracting, developing and retaining capable individuals.
2. Strategy and Objective-Setting: includes the principles of Analyzing business context, Defining risk appetite, Evaluating alternative strategies and Formulating business objectives.
3. Performance: includes the principles of Identifying risk, Assessing severity of risk, Prioritizing risk, Implementing risk responses and Developing portfolio view.
4. Review and Revision: includes the principles of Assessing substantial change, Reviewing risk and performance, and Pursuing improvement in enterprise risk management.
5. Information, Communication and Reporting: includes the principles of Leveraging information and technology, Communicating risk information and Reporting on risk, culture and performance.

=== IIA Three Lines Model ===
Developed by the Institute of Internal Auditors, the Three Lines Model, formerly the Three Lines of Defense (3LOD), delineates three lines of responsibility and sets out the roles and responsibilities for each.Ultimate oversight of the organization remains the purview of the board, which sets the risk appetite, delegates authority, and receives assurance reports to guide its strategic decision-making.

1. First line (management): Designs and operates internal controls and operational processes to meet operational objectives while managing risk and complying with legal and policy requirements.
2. Second line (specialist): Made up of specialized units (e.g. cybersecurity, risk management, quality assurance, regulatory compliance) that provide expert advice, guidance and monitoring to first-line operations.
3. Third line (internal audit): Provides an independent and objective assurance on the effectiveness of GRC and internal controls through direct functional reporting to the board, without assuming operational management authority.

=== Control Objectives for Information and Related Technologies (COBIT) ===
Developed by ISACA, COBIT is a framework for the governance and management of enterprise information and technology that seeks to bridge the gap between IT risks, control needs and technical issues, ensuring IT resources are aligned with organizational objectives and strategies. Conceptualized as the COBIT Cube, the framework links three core dimensions:

1. IT Resources: Physical and intellectual assets deployed to deliver services, consisting of Applications, Information, Infrastructure and People.
2. IT Processes: 34 processes and control activities across the operational domains.
3. Information Criteria: Used to measure information quality, split into 3 categories consisting of Quality (Effectiveness, Efficiency), Security (Confidentiality, Integrity, Availability) and Fiduciary (Compliance, Reliability) Criteria.

== Contemporary Trends ==
=== ESG Criteria and Integrated Reporting ===
Beyond the financial disclosures mandated by the Sarbanes-Oxley Act and similar legislation, a number of jurisdictions, driven by the needs of stakeholders such as governments and investors, now require companies to report on Environmental, Social and Governance issues. Disclosures have been mandated regarding environmental impacts, executive pay ratios, sustainability, and human rights issues. Since 2022, companies in the UK have been required to divulge their climate-related financial risks.Integrated Reporting has emerged as one tool used to provide such information, requiring organizations to account for their performance across financial, manufactured, intellectual, human, social and natural capitals, exposing their intersections. A 2021 Italian study links the adoption of governance structures featuring larger board sizes, greater board gender diversity and the establishment of board-level Corporate Social Responsibility or Sustainability Committee to a positive effect on the quality of environmental disclosures within integrated reports.

=== Board Composition and Diversity ===
Initially recommending organizations to voluntarily adopt diversity measures, governance frameworks now include mandates regarding the disclosure of diversity-related metrics. Historically focused on gender representation, these mandates have expanded across broader demographic categories. In Canada, the passage of Bill C-25 mandated CBCA companies to publicly report on their representation metrics as well as written policies regarding designated groups (women, visible minorities, Indigenous peoples and persons with disabilities). In the UK, market reviews supported by the Financial Reporting Council and Listing Rules have established diversity benchmarks. Under LR 9.8.6R(9), companies must disclose whether they meet diversity targets: at least 40% female representation on the board of directors, at least one senior independent director or chief executive is a woman, and at least one member of the board is an ethnic minority.Beyond complying with regulatory requirements, diversifying boardroom demographics has been viewed as a method to protect brand equity, enhance strategic oversight and improve stakeholder relationships.

=== AI Governance and GRC Automation ===
As companies have begun to adopt artificial intelligence to help run their businesses, the risks intrinsic to AI raise GRC challenges to companies using AI products. As of 2025, some companies were beginning to adopt AI tools to help them manage GRC. AI and machine learning has been deployed in automated security operations centers, real-time fraud monitoring, and credit scoring, introducing challenges regarding algorithmic bias and data privacy.In response, regulators have introduced legislation such as the EU AI Act which classifies AI applications by their risk of causing harm and imposes transparency requirements.As of 2026, businesses seeking a competitive advantage have replaced manual monitoring of compliance requirements with cloud-based and automated GRC software platforms, aiming to reduce human error and deliver risk indicators to decision-makers in real-time by leveraging predictive analytics and automated audit trails.

== See also ==
- Conformity assessment
- Information governance
- ISO 37301:2021 Compliance Management Systems (Previously ISO 19600)
- ISO 31000:2018 Risk Management
- ISO 41001:2018 Facility management — Management systems
- Records management
- Regulatory compliance
- Corporate liability
