= Electronic Fund Transfer Act =

Act passed by the U.S. Congress in 1978

- Other short titles: Financial Institutions Regulatory and Interest Rate Control Act of 1978; Change in Bank Control Act; Change in Savings and Loan Control Act; Depository Institution Management Interlocks Act; Export-Import Bank Act Amendments; Federal Financial Institutions Examination Council Act; National Credit Union Central Liquidity Facility Act; Right to Financial Privacy Act
- Long title: An Act to extend the authority for the flexible regulation of interest rates on deposits and accounts in depository institutions.
- Nicknames: American Arts Gold Medallion Act
- Enacted by: the 95th United States Congress
- Effective: November 10, 1978

Citations
- Public law: 95-630
- Statutes at Large: 92 Stat. 3641 aka 92 Stat. 3728

Codification
- Titles amended: 12 U.S.C.: Banks and Banking; 15 U.S.C.: Commerce and Trade
- U.S.C. sections amended: 12 U.S.C. ch. 3 § 226 et seq.; 15 U.S.C. ch. 41 § 1601 et seq.; 15 U.S.C. ch. 41 § 1693 et seq.

Legislative history
- Introduced in the House as H.R. 14279 by Fernand St. Germain (D-RI) on October 10, 1978; Committee consideration by House Banking, Finance, and Urban Affairs, Senate Banking, Housing, and Urban Affairs; Passed the House on October 11, 1978 (passed); Passed the Senate on October 12, 1978 (passed) with amendment; House agreed to Senate amendment on October 14, 1978 (341–32, in lieu of H.Res. 1439) with further amendment; Senate agreed to House amendment on October 14, 1978 (agreed); Signed into law by President Jimmy Carter on November 10, 1978

Major amendments
- Credit CARD Act of 2009

The Electronic Fund Transfer Act was passed by the U.S. Congress in 1978 and signed by President Jimmy Carter, to establish the rights and liabilities of consumers as well as the responsibilities of all participants in electronic funds transfer activities.

The act's provisions were implemented through Federal Reserve Board Regulation E.

== Rights of consumers ==
The EFT Act recognizes the right of consumers to choose the financial institution to which their payments are directed.

The EFT Act also prohibits a creditor or lender from requiring a consumer to repay a loan or other credit by electronic fund transfer, except when there is an overdraft on checking plans.

== Financial institution liability ==
The financial institution must give the customer notice of his liability in case the card is lost or stolen. This notice must include a phone number for reporting card loss and a description of the financial institution's error resolution process.

== Limit to customer liability on loss or theft of card ==
If a customer promptly reports a missing or stolen card to the financial institution before any unauthorized transactions occur, the cardholder will not be held responsible for subsequent transactions.

A customer can be liable for unauthorized withdrawals if their card is lost or stolen and they do not follow certain criteria:

- Loss is limited to $50 if the institution is notified within two business days
- Loss could be up to $500 if the institution is notified between 3 and 59 days
- If the loss is not reported within 60 business days customer risks unlimited loss on transfers made after the 60-day period – could lose all money in the account plus maximum overdraft if any.

== EFT errors ==
EFT is not a perfect system; therefore customers should still be diligent in reviewing their EFT statements for possible errors as they would with any other type of transaction. Should a customer notice that there has been an error in an electronic fund transfer relating to their account certain steps must be taken:

Under the Act, the customer must:

- Write or call the financial institution immediately if possible
- Must be no later than 60 days from the date of the erroneous statement
- Give their name and account number
- Explain why they believe there is an error, the type, dollar amount and date
- May be required to send details of the error in writing within 10 business days

Under the Act, the financial institution must:

- Promptly investigate the error and resolve it within 45 days
- Errors involving new accounts (opened last 30 days), POS transactions, and foreign transactions may take up to 90 days
- If it takes more than 10 business days to complete the investigation:
  - Must recredit the amount in question
- For new accounts may take up to 20 business days to recredit the account
- Must notify the customer of the results of the investigation:
  - If there was an error – correct it or make recredit final
  - If no error – explanation in writing, notify the customer of deducted recredit
- Customer has the right to ask for copies of any documents relied on in the investigation

== What the EFT Act Covers ==
- The EFT Act does not apply to every type of pre-authorized plan. The EFT Act does not apply to automatic transfers from any account held in the name of the institution the consumer uses to the account the consumer uses.
  - An example of this would be where the EFT Act would not apply to any automatic payments put towards a mortgage held by the financial institution where a consumer would hold their electronic fund's account.
- The EFT Act also does not apply to automatic transfers between a consumer's accounts at the same financial institution
- The EFT Act also does not cover all transfers. Some banks, other financial institutions, and vendors will produce cards with a cash value imprinted into the card itself
  - Examples of these include public transit passes, store gift cards, and prepaid telephone cards. These cards may not be covered by the EFT Act.
- When using electronic funds transfer, the Act does not give the consumer the right to stop payment.
- State law or any contract that imposes a lower liability limit than those mentioned in the “Loss or Theft: Customer Liability” will be preempted (overridden) by the federal EFT Act unless the state law provides protections that are greater than that provided under Federal law. (See Section 919 of the Act).

== See also ==
- Electronic funds transfer
