= Electronic billing =

Electronic presenting and payment of bills

Electronic billing or electronic bill payment and presentment, is when a seller such as company, organization, or group sends its bills or invoices over the internet, and customers pay the bills electronically. This replaces the traditional method where invoices are sent in paper form and payments are done by manual means such as sending cheques.

Advantages to electronic billing include the faster presentation of invoices and reductions in costs compared to handling paper documents. However, to take full advantage of electronic billing both seller and buyer need to have in place computer systems able to handle electronic billing and have access to financial institutions that can do electronic payments.

Electronic bill payment is a feature of online, mobile and telephone banking, similar in its effect to a giro, allowing a customer of a financial institution to transfer money from their transaction or credit card account to a creditor or vendor such as a public utility, department store or an individual to be credited against a specific account. These payments are typically executed electronically as a direct deposit through a national payment system, operated by the banks or in conjunction with the government. Payment is typically initiated by the payer but can also be set up as a direct debit. In addition to the bill payment facility, most banks will also offer various features with their electronic bill payment systems. These include the ability to schedule payments in advance to be made on a specified date (convenient for installments such as mortgage and support payments), to save the biller information for reuse at a future time and various options for searching the recent payment history. In many cases the payment data can also be downloaded and posted directly into the customer's accounting or personal finance software.

== History ==
=== Billing ===
The development of electronic billing and payments started in the late 20th century, and whilst its exact origins are unclear, it is generally agreed that development of electronic billing coincided with the rise of the Information Age. It went hand-in-hand with the development of internet banking, introduction of accounting software and widespread use of email.

In the United States, the Council for Electronic Billing and Payment of the National Automated Clearing House Association (NACHA) is credited with broadly promoting and communicating various forms of electronic billing in the early 2000s. NACHA promoted activities and initiatives that facilitated the adoption of electronic payments in the areas of Internet commerce, electronic bill payment and presentment, financial electronic data interchange (EDI), international payments, electronic checks, electronic benefit transfer (EBT) and student lending. Certain electronic billing applications also provide the ability to electronically settle payment for goods or services.

=== Bill payment ===
Although this technology was available from the mid-1990s, uptake was initially slow until internet access by households increased. Early adopters were primarily businesses and tech-savvy consumers with regular internet connectivity and a need for more efficient financial management. Most consumers were still reliant on traditional check-based or in-person payment methods due to concerns about online security, lack of digital literacy, and limited access to banking interfaces compatible with electronic payment systems.

By 2000, as broadband internet became more widely available and banks began integrating online services into their customer offerings, the adoption of electronic bill payment systems started to dramatically increase. Financial institutions began to offer user-friendly interfaces that allowed customers to schedule one-time or recurring payments, reducing the need for paper checks and manual processing.

The 2000s saw rapid innovation in the space, with third-party services and fintech startups entering the market, offering features such as automatic payment reminders, multi-account management, and mobile app integration. This led to greater consumer trust and convenience, making electronic bill payment a standard feature in most banking platforms by the end of the decade.

Government agencies and utilities also began accepting electronic payments, further accelerating the shift away from paper-based billing. By the 2010s, electronic bill payment had become the norm in many developed countries, supported by enhanced security protocols, encryption standards, and growing consumer expectations for digital convenience.

== Types of electronic payment ==
- Biller-direct – where consumers make payments directly to one biller that issues bills that they receive at the website of the firm that issued the bill. An example would be of a public utility company offering this payment service to its consumers. A market has emerged for outsourced billing providers who specialize in electronic billing processes and technology for companies that need to send bills directly to their customers.
- Bank-aggregator – where a payment is made at an aggregator or consolidator site, usually from a consumer's bank's website. This model allows the consumer to make payments to multiple billers that are pre-registered to receive payments. Examples are OneVu in the UK and eBill in Switzerland.

== Impact ==
From the consumer's point of view, electronic payment of bills is cheaper, faster, and more convenient than writing, posting and reconciling cheques. In addition, though limitations exist, a wider range of bank accounts or credit cards can be used for the electronic payment of bills. Paying bills online allows you to use a variety of payment methods rather than the traditional cheque.

Using electronic bill presentment and payment enables businesses to fast-track customer payments and get access to funds faster, which in turn results in cash flow improvement.

For banks the advantages of electronic bill payments are a reduction in processing costs minimizing paperwork and an increase in customer loyalty. In a 2003 study, the banks said that "customers who pay online show more loyalty and are more receptive to other offers".

== See also ==
- Direct credit
- Digital wallet
- Digital economy
- E-commerce payment system
- E-commerce
- Electronic invoicing
- Electronic receipt
- Legal Electronic Data Exchange Standard
- Mobile banking
- Online shopping
- Payments as a service
- Unified Payments Interface
