= Direct deposit =

Deposit of money by a payer into a payee's account

A direct deposit (or direct credit), in banking, is a deposit of money by a payer directly into a payee's bank account. Direct deposits are most commonly made by businesses in the payment of salaries and wages and for the payment of suppliers' accounts, but the facility can be used for payments for any purpose, such as payment of bills, taxes, and other government charges.

When making a direct deposit by means of electronic funds transfer, the payer also normally enters reference information to make it easy for the payee to recognise who made the deposit and which account to credit. The reference may be an account number, an invoice number, the payer's name, or some other meaningful identification.

== Alternatives ==
If a funds recipient does not have a bank account, but a payer is obligated to pay by electronic funds transfer, alternative payment arrangements need to be made. For example, a US law of 1996 required the federal government to make electronic payments, such as direct deposit, available by 1999. As a part of its implementation, the US Treasury Department paired with Comerica Bank and MasterCard in 2008 to offer the Direct Express Debit MasterCard prepaid debit card, which can be used to make payments to federal benefit recipients who do not have a bank account.

== See also ==
- Debit card
- Direct debit
- Electronic bill payment
- Wire transfer
