= Weimar+ =

Intergovernmental alliance of EU nations and the UK

- Status: Operational
- Type: Regional diplomatic and political alliance
- Membership: France; Germany; Poland; Italy; Spain; United Kingdom; European Union
- Establishment: 12 February 2025; 16 months ago
- Historical era: 2020s European rearmament

Weimar+ (or Weimar Plus) is a European diplomatic and geopolitical alliance first named in February 2025, expanding upon the original Weimar Triangle regional alliance of France, Germany, and Poland (all within the European Union) to include additional major European powers such as the United Kingdom and Italy. The group was immediately established in response to shifts in United States foreign policy towards the ongoing Russo-Ukrainian War and the transatlantic security architecture under the Trump administration, particularly United States president Donald Trump's telephone conversation with Russian president Vladimir Putin excluding Europe from Ukraine-related negotiations.

As of November 2025, Weimar+ exists in the form of summits between the leaders of the six countries and EU, and, separately, of their foreign ministers and EU HRVP.

== History ==
The Weimar+ group was established as an expansion of the Weimar Triangle (France, Germany, and Poland) to include the United Kingdom, Italy, Spain, and the European Commission as participants, with foreign ministers serving as primary representatives. Unlike its coordinate-parent organisation, the expanded format includes both EU members and the United Kingdom.

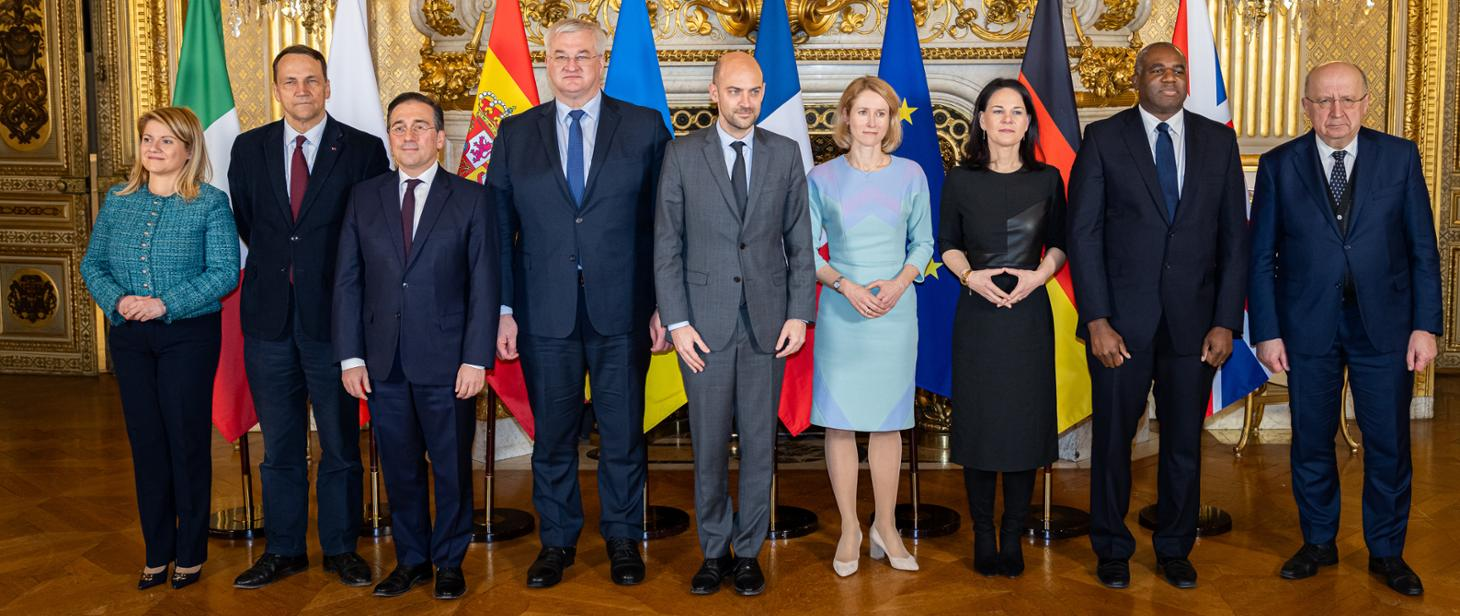
Inaugural meeting of foreign ministers, Paris, 12 February 2025. Pictured left-to-right: Maria Tripodi (Italy), Radosław Sikorski (Poland), José Manuel Albares (Spain), Andrii Sybiha (Ukraine), Jean-Noël Barrot (France), Kaja Kallas (European Union), Annalena Baerbock (Germany), David Lammy (United Kingdom), Andrius Kubilius (European Union)

The group's exigent inaugural meeting on 12 February 2025 in Paris was in response to rapid developments in United States-led peace initiatives regarding the Russo-Ukrainian War, primarily United States president Donald Trump's telephone conversation the day before with Russian president Vladimir Putin. Foreign Minister of France Jean-Noël Barrot stated during the meeting that without European involvement, there would be "no just and lasting peace in Ukraine". Spanish foreign minister José Manuel Albares expressed that European governments needed "unity" towards sustaining Ukraine position to be part of the negotiations.

The group made its first public statement under the Weimar+ name following the meeting, written in direct response to President Donald Trump's insistence that neither European nor Ukrainian delegates would be involved in negotiations to end the conflict. The joint declaration affirmed continued European support for Ukraine until the achievement of a "just, comprehensive, and sustainable peace", with or without the United States. The group specifically emphasised that any peace agreement must protect both Ukrainian and broader European security interests. They also asserted the necessity of European participation in any negotiation process concerning Ukraine's future, and that negotiations must put Ukraine "in a position of strength". The statement mentioned the possibility of increased military spending among European nations to promoting the sovereignty of Europe as a power that could geopolitically operate independently of the United States.

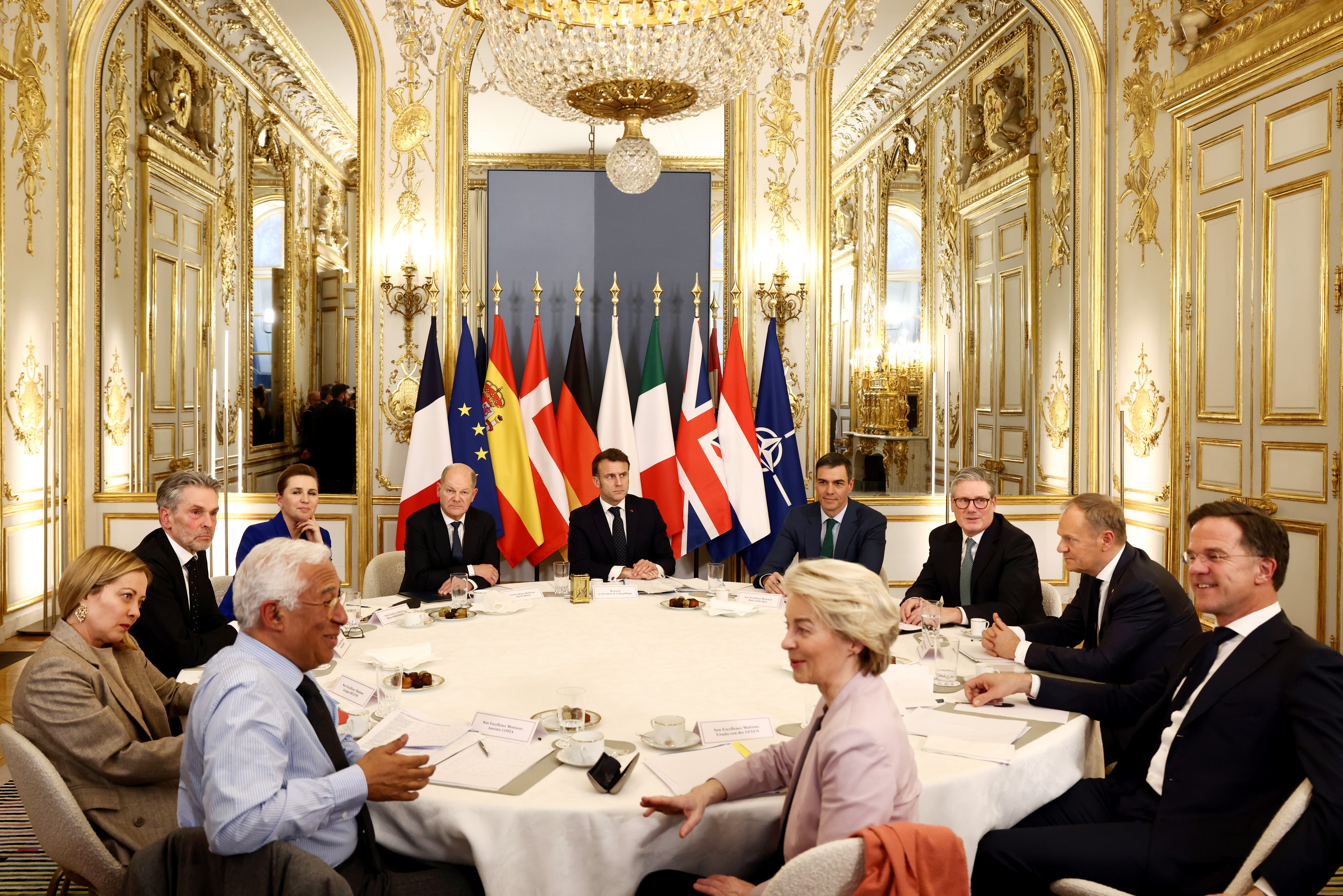
Summit on 17 February 2025, Paris, Elysee Palace (and Denmark, the Netherlands, NATO)

On 15 February, French president Emmanuel Macron announced a high-level diplomatic summit for 17 February 2025 under Weimar+. The emergency summit was arranged at Elysee Palace in Paris following United States vice president JD Vance's controversial speech at the 61st Munich Security Conference, accusing European leaders of democratic backsliding and restricting freedom of speech mainly regarding the annulment of the 2024 Romanian presidential election, increased social media regulation, and prosecution regarding safe access zones and speech regarding religion. Prime Minister of Greece Kyriakos Mitsotakis called the Weimar+ summit a marker of the end of Europe's "age of innocence" operating under American geopolitical interests, and an opportunity to rapidly prioritize its own "strategic autonomy" under a united framework. He agreed to communicate with its representatives.

Joint Declaration of the group's foreign ministers and EU's HRVP was adopted at the 31 March 2025, Madrid meeting.

On 12 May, the UK hosted talks of the Weimar+ group foreign ministers focused on Ukraine and the future of European security at Lancaster House in London. Following the meeting, Weimar+ Joint Statement on Ukraine and Euro-Atlantic security was issued

On 12 June, Italy hosted the group's foreign ministers in Rome, joined by their counterpart from Ukraine, NATO Secretary General Mark Rutte and the EU High Commissioner, Kaja Kallas. "We reiterated our readiness to step up our pressure on Russia as it continues to refuse serious and credible commitments, including through further sanctions and countering their circumvention," the foreign ministers' statement said.

The August 2025 Weimar+ ministerial was convened in Warsaw, Poland, on 6 August 2025, coinciding with the inauguration of President Karol Nawrocki. The symbolism of holding the meeting in Poland was twofold: Poland’s position as a frontline state in regional security and its new presidency’s alignment with European engagement in defence. Polish media referenced the joint “declaration of intent” emerging from the ministerial, framing it as both a practical and symbolic guarantee of Poland’s role in Europe’s security renaissance.

The October Weimar+ ministerial was hosted alongside the high-profile 7th European Political Community Summit (EPC) in Copenhagen. The two-day sequence began with an informal European Council session focused on defence readiness, followed by the EPC plenary and roundtables. Media coverage emphasizes unprecedented summit security, leaders’ unity against Russian provocations, and major steps on EU joint defence.

Where August ministerial centered on the immediate operational and strategic imperatives of the Black Sea, the October agenda reflected systemic EU transformation in defence-Readiness 2030, multi-level sanctions enforcement, and direct inclusion of Ukraine as both security beneficiary and partner. Both meetings included Ukrainian cabinet officials.

== See also ==
- 2020s European re-armament – Funding and reindustrialisation of European militaries
- Big Four (Western Europe) – Refers to France, Germany, Italy and the United Kingdom
- Coalition of the willing (Russo-Ukrainian war) – Group of countries in support of Ukrainian sovereignty
- E5 (European Group of Five) – Intergovernmental alliance of biggest European defence spenders
- EU three – France, Germany, and Italy as the major EU founding members
- Multinational Force–Ukraine – Proposed force for peace enforcement
- NATO – Intergovernmental military alliance
- ReArm Europe – European strategic defence initiative

== External references ==
- "Joint Declaration by the Foreign Ministers of Germany, France, Italy, Poland, Spain, the United Kingdom as well as the High Representative of the European Union for Foreign Affairs and Security Policy (12 December 2024)". 12 December 2024 – via France Diplomacy–Ministry for Europe and Foreign Affairs.
- "Joint Declaration by the Foreign Ministers of Germany, France, Poland, Italy, Spain and the United Kingdom in Warsaw, 19 November". Foreign, Commonwealth & Development Office and The Rt Hon David Lammy MP. 19 November 2024 – via GOV.uk.
