= Quint (international coalition) =

Coalition of US, UK, France, Germany, Italy

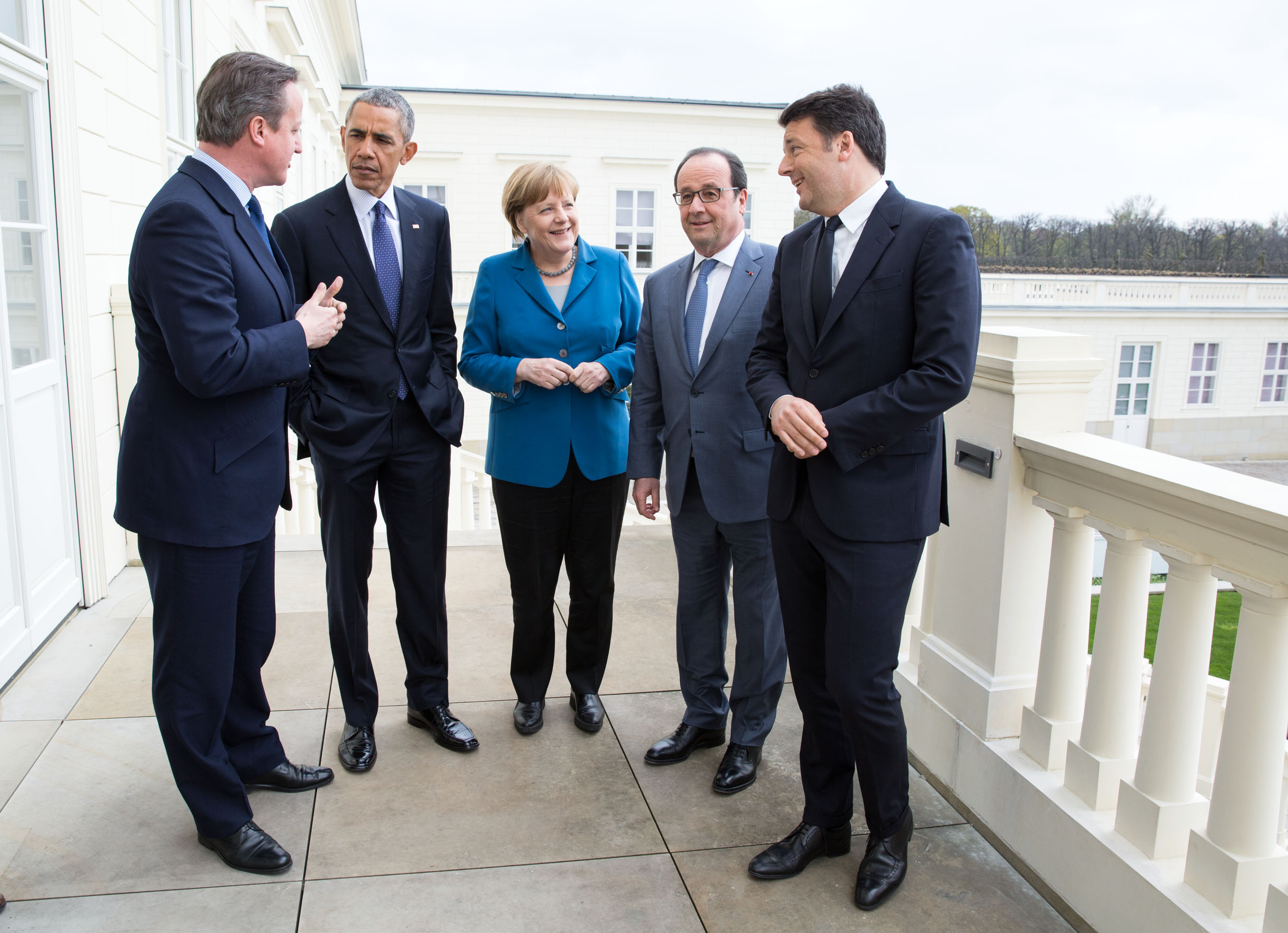
David Cameron, Barack Obama, Angela Merkel, François Hollande and Matteo Renzi in 2016

The Quint is an informal decision-making group consisting of the United States and the Big Four of Western Europe (France, Germany, Italy and the United Kingdom). All the countries forming it are allies and members of NATO, the OECD and the G7/G20.

The United States, The United Kingdom and France are nuclear-weapon states, while Germany and Italy are part of the nuclear weapons sharing program.

== History ==
The idea of a trilateral axis on foreign policy issues was proposed by French President Charles de Gaulle to his British and American counterparts (see Fouchet Plan). However, that plan was never implemented. Meetings with that goal took place around 1980 between the foreign ministers of these three countries and West Germany, although they were largely symbolic and led to no real decision. The Quint in its current form seems to have begun as the Contact Group excluding Russia. Nowadays, Quint leaders discuss all major international topics participating in video conferences or meeting one another in various forums such as NATO, the OSCE, the G20 and the UN. The Quint meets also at ministerial and experts' level. Quint countries along with Russia and China participate together in global discussions as in the Syrian case, they have joint statements and meetings as in the case of Lebanon.

== Current government leaders ==
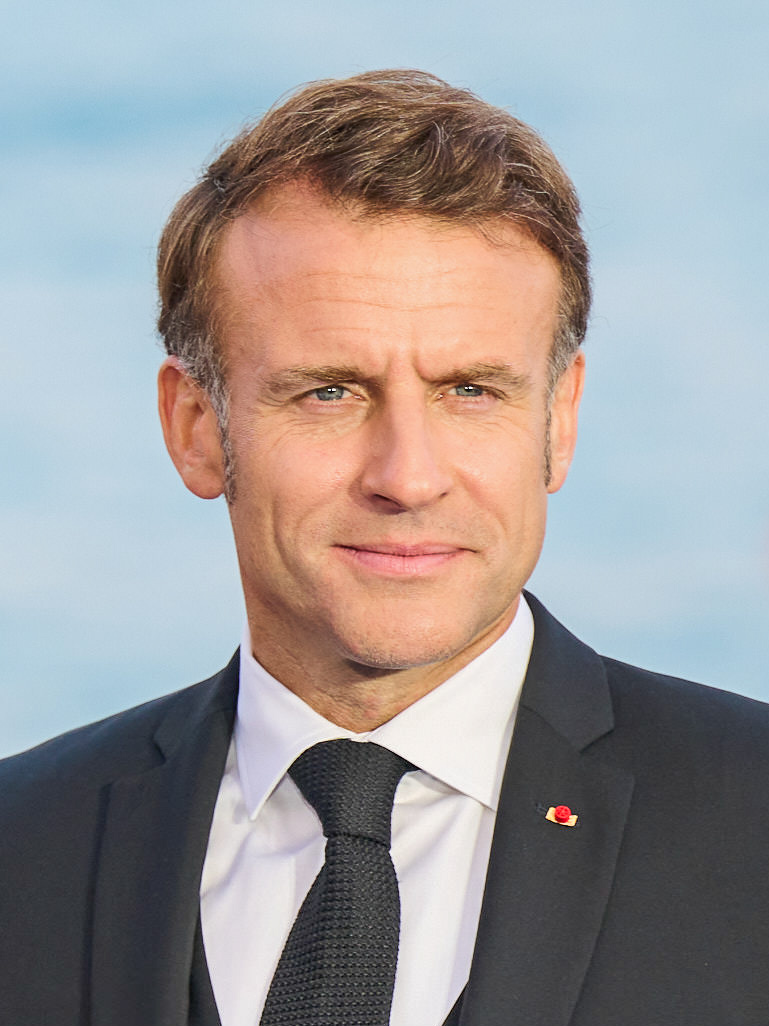
(France) France
Emmanuel Macron, President

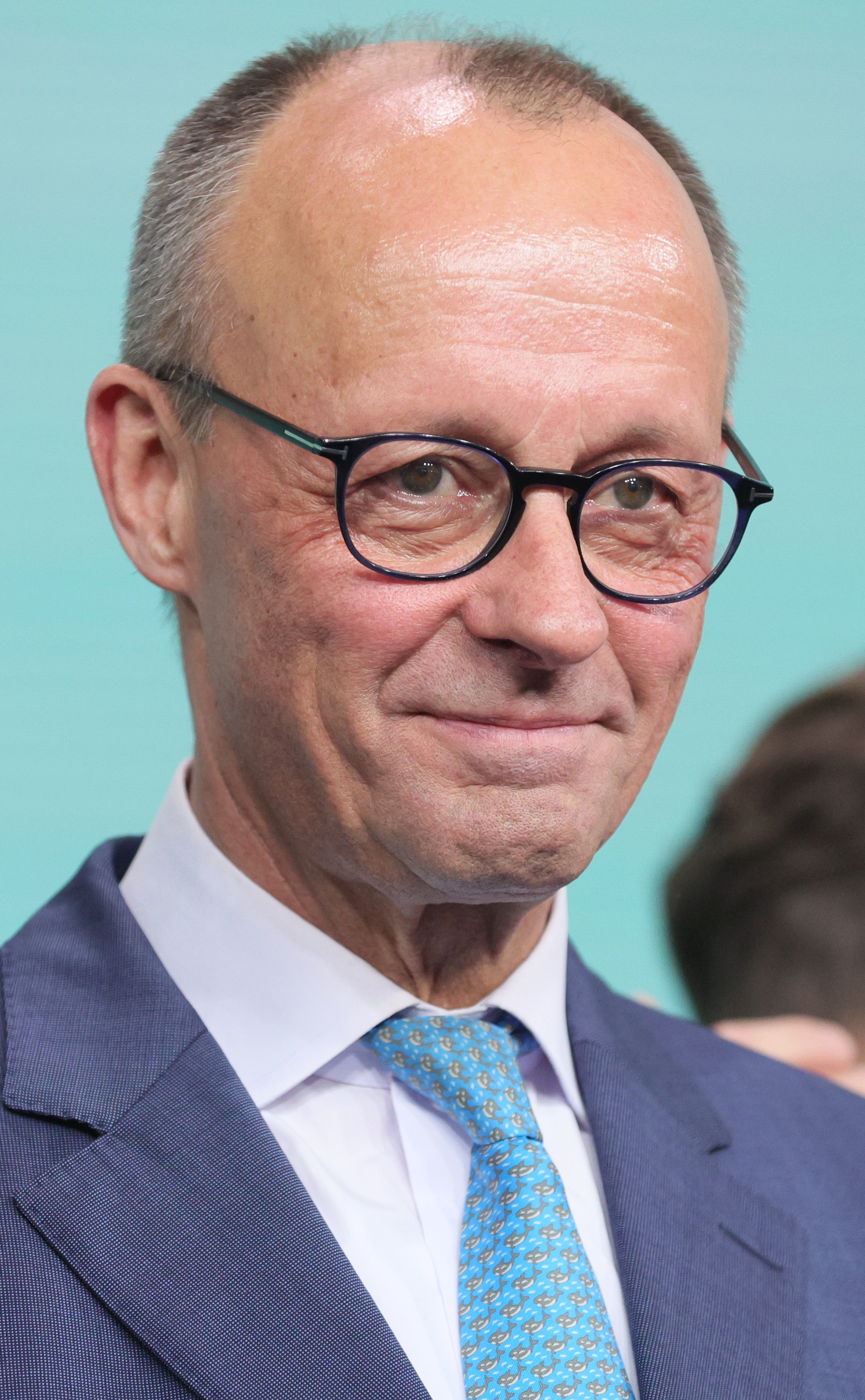
(Germany) Germany
Friedrich Merz, Chancellor

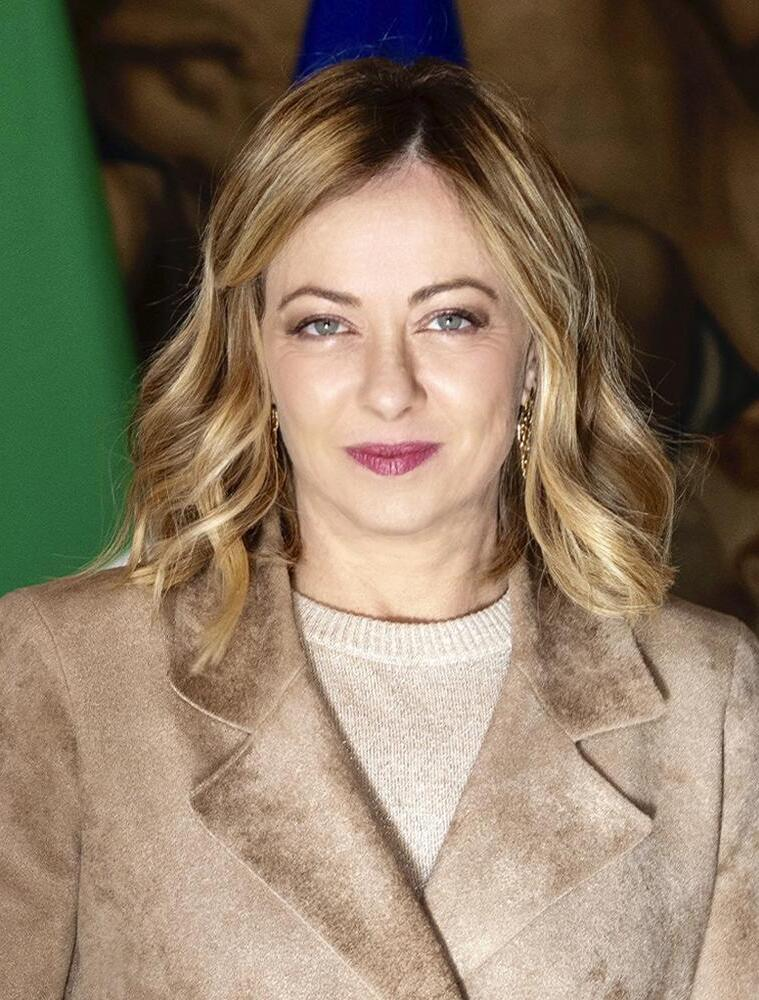
(Italy) Italy
Giorgia Meloni, Prime Minister

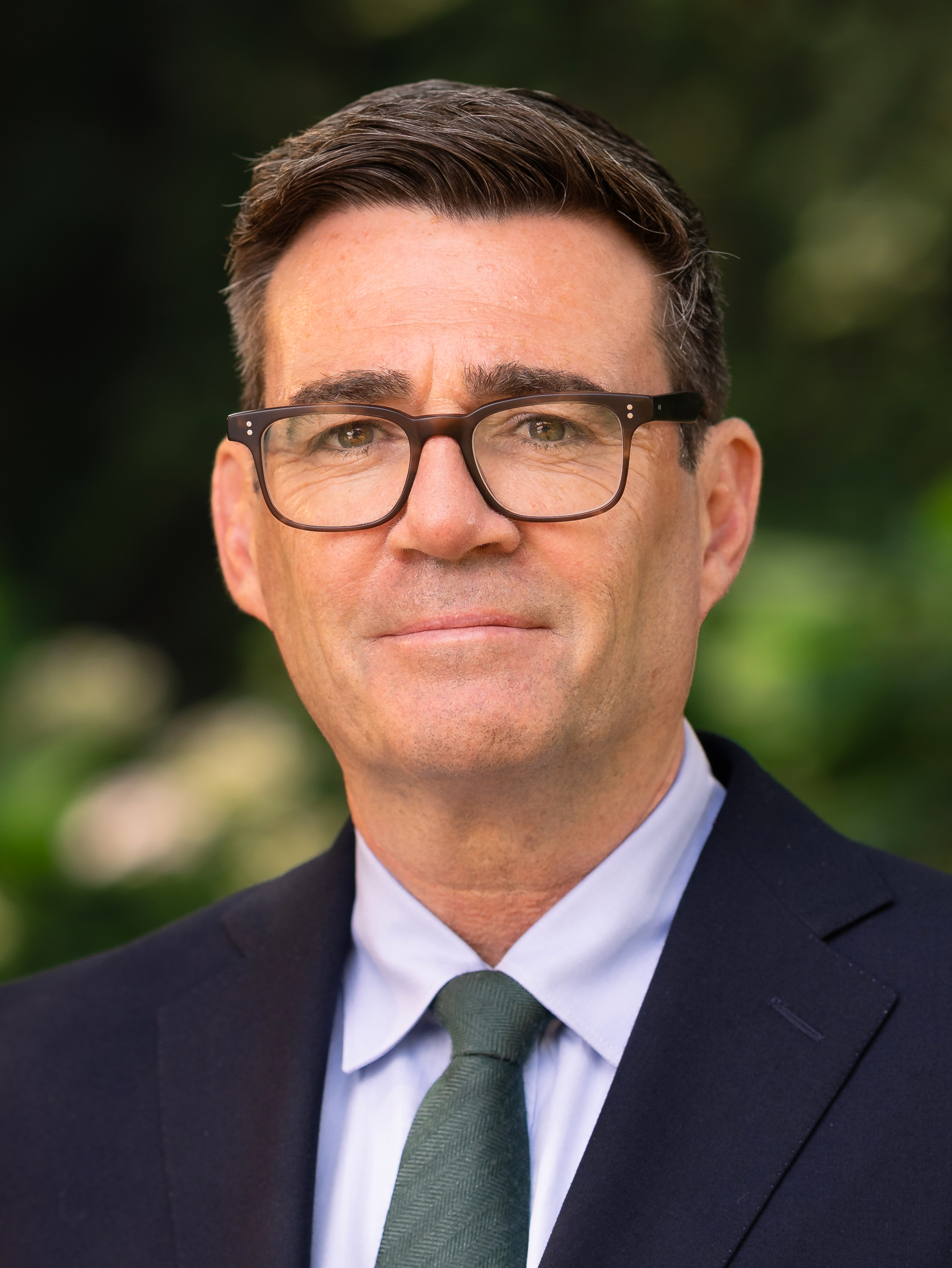
(United Kingdom) United Kingdom
Andy Burnham, Prime Minister

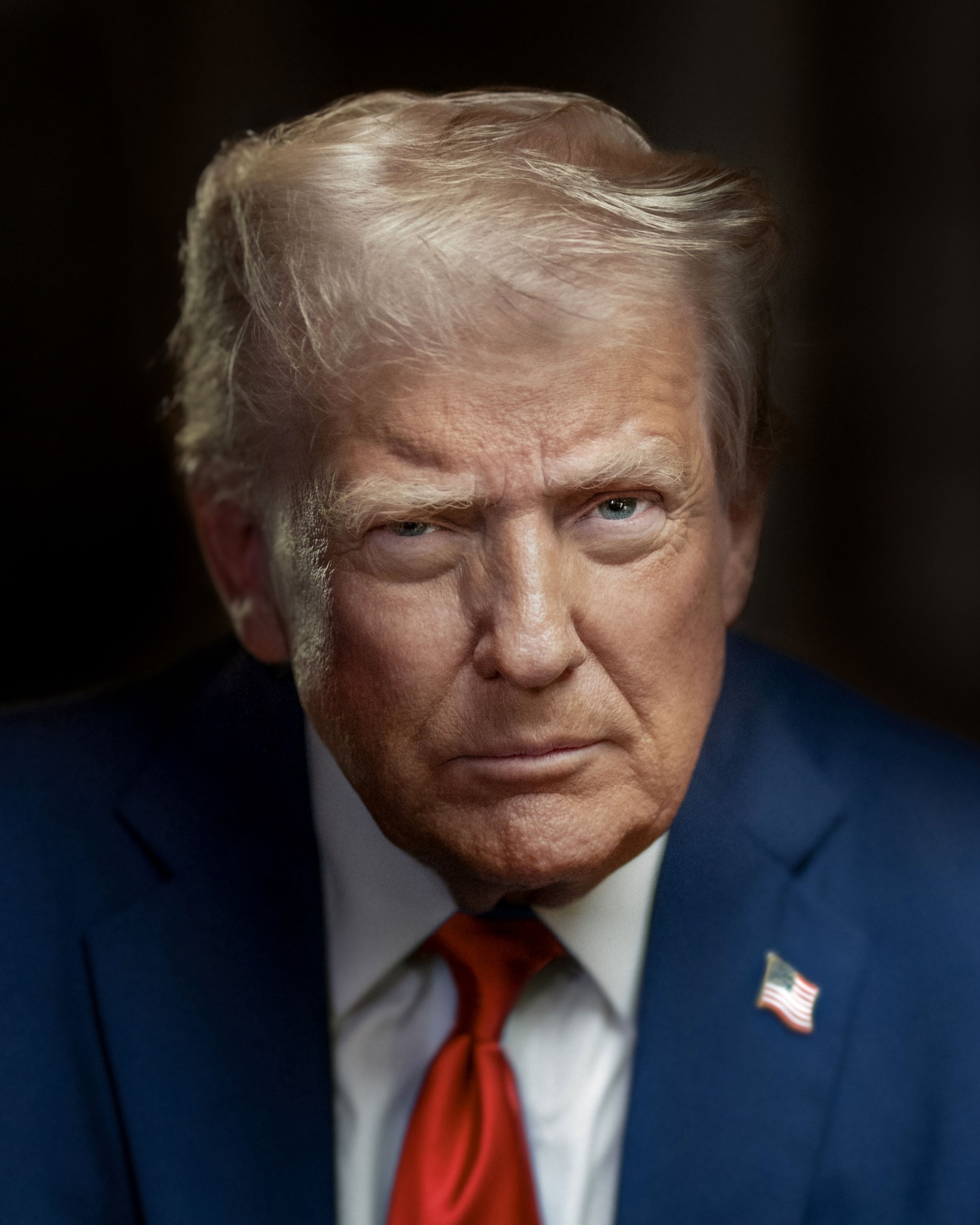
(United States) United States
Donald Trump, President

== See also ==
- Big Four (Western Europe)
- E5 (European Group of Five)
- EU three
- Great power
- Inner Six
- Power (international relations)
