= Europe, the Middle East and Africa =

Geographical region for global institutional and marketing planning

EMEA: Europe, the Middle East, and Africa, marked on a world map.

EMEA (Europe, the Middle East and Africa) is a geographic designation used by institutions, governments, global marketing, media, and business sectors—especially in North American business circles—when referring to this region.

As the name suggests, the region includes all of the countries found on the continents of Africa and Europe, as well as the countries that make up the Middle East. The region is generally accepted to include all European nations and all African nations, and extends east to Iran, including a part of Russia. Typically, the acronym does not include overseas territories of mainland countries in the region, such as French Guiana. However, the term is not completely clear, and while it usually refers to Europe, the Middle East and Africa, it is not uncommon for businesses and other institutions to slightly tweak the countries they include under this umbrella term.

One of the reasons why the term is commonly used is because it is useful for business purposes, as most of the region falls within four time zones, which facilitates communication and travel.

== Historical influence ==
The historical influence and interdependence of Europe on the Middle East and Africa in relation to trade routes contributed to the development of the term EMEA. The establishment of the Suez Canal in 1869 impacted international commerce. It directly linked Europe to the Indian Ocean and East Asian trade routes. The direct channel between Britain and India enabled Britain to gradually gain authority over Egypt, and rule Egypt until 1956, when the last British forces withdrew following the Anglo-Egyptian evacuation agreement. Britain's rule there, until 1956, was reinforced via the development and maintenance of the Pax Britannica which gave Britain naval power and control over the world's maritime trade routes during the late nineteenth century period of peace.

== Related regions ==
- Eastern Europe, Middle East and Africa (EEMEA). Some companies separate their Eastern European business from the rest of Europe, and refer to the EEMEA region separately from the Western/Central European (EU/EFTA) region
- Southern Europe, Middle East and Africa (SEMEA)
- Southeastern Europe, Middle East and Africa (SEEMEA)
- Central and Eastern Europe (CEE)
- Central Europe, Middle East and Africa (CEMEA)
- The Middle East and Africa (MEA)
- The Middle East and North Africa (MENA)
- The Middle East, Turkey and Africa (META)
- The Middle East, North Africa, Afghanistan and Pakistan (MENAP)
- Europe and the Middle East (EME)
- Europe, the Middle East and North Africa (EUMENA or EMENA)
- Europe, the Middle East, India and Africa (EMEIA or EMIA)
- Europe, the Middle East, Africa and Russia (EMEAR)
- Europe, the Middle East, Africa and Commonwealth of Independent States (EMEACIS)
- Europe, the Middle East, Africa and Caribbean (EMEAC)
- The Commonwealth of Independent States (CIS), around the Black Sea and Caspian Sea
- North Atlantic and Central Europe (NACE)
- Central and Eastern Europe, the Middle East and Africa (CEMA) / (CEEMEA)
- Europe, Latin America, Africa, Arab world

== Component areas ==
The EMEA region generally includes:

=== Europe ===
==== Central and Eastern Europe ====
- Belarus
- Bulgaria
- Czech Republic
- Hungary
- Moldova
- Poland
- Romania
- Russia
- Slovakia
- Ukraine

==== Northern Europe ====
- Denmark
- Estonia
- Finland
- Iceland
- Latvia
- Lithuania
- Norway
- Sweden

==== Southern Europe ====
- Albania
- Andorra
- Bosnia and Herzegovina
- Croatia
- Greece
- Italy
- Kosovo
- Malta
- Monaco
- Montenegro
- North Macedonia
- Portugal
- San Marino
- Serbia
- Slovenia
- Spain
- Vatican City

==== Western Europe ====
- Austria
- Belgium
- France
- Germany
- Ireland
- Liechtenstein
- Luxembourg
- Monaco
- Netherlands
- Switzerland
- United Kingdom

=== Southern Caucasus ===
- Armenia
- Azerbaijan
- Georgia

=== Central Asia ===
- Kazakhstan
- Kyrgyzstan
- Tajikistan
- Turkmenistan
- Uzbekistan

=== Middle East and North Africa (MENA) ===
- Afghanistan
- Algeria
- Bahrain
- Cyprus
- Egypt
- Iran
- Iraq
- Israel
- Jordan
- Kuwait
- Lebanon
- Libya
- Morocco
- Oman
- Palestine
- Qatar
- Saudi Arabia
- Sudan
- Syria
- Tunisia
- Turkey
- United Arab Emirates
- Yemen

=== Sub-Saharan Africa ===
==== Eastern Africa ====
- Burundi
- Djibouti
- Eritrea
- Ethiopia
- Kenya
- Rwanda
- Somalia
- South Sudan
- Tanzania
- Uganda

==== Central Africa ====
- Cameroon
- Central African Republic
- Chad
- Democratic Republic of the Congo
- Republic of the Congo
- Equatorial Guinea
- Gabon
- São Tomé and Príncipe

==== Southern Africa ====
- Angola
- Botswana
- Comoros
- Eswatini
- Lesotho
- Madagascar
- Malawi
- Mauritius
- Mozambique
- Namibia
- Seychelles
- South Africa
- Zambia
- Zimbabwe

==== Western Africa ====
- Benin
- Burkina Faso
- Cape Verde
- Gambia
- Ghana
- Guinea
- Guinea-Bissau
- Ivory Coast
- Liberia
- Mali
- Mauritania
- Niger
- Nigeria
- Saint Helena, Ascension and Tristan da Cunha
- Senegal
- Sierra Leone
- Togo

== Economic overview ==
The World Bank's April 2024 update indicates that the growth rate for the Europe, Middle-East and African region, is expected to slightly increase to 4.6% in 2024, up from 4.4% in 2023. This underscores a diverse economic resilience against global pressures. Meanwhile, global trade growth, which was minimal at 0.2% in 2023, is projected to improve to 2.3% in 2024, crucial for the region's export-oriented economies. However, private investment remains below pre-pandemic levels due to higher debt levels and rising interest rates, signaling a cautious investment climate. The region faces significant challenges from both external factors, such as high core inflation and modest global trade recovery, and domestic issues like increased debt and political uncertainties, potentially hindering economic growth. Additionally, a hypothetical 1% decline in GDP growth in the US or China could reduce GDP growth in other developing Europe, Middle-East and African economies by approximately 0.5% and 0.3%, respectively. The increase in trade-distorting measures, which have tripled since 2019 among G-20 countries, reflects a trend towards protective industrial policies, although other European, Middle-Eastern, and African countries, except for the Big Four, South Africa, Russia, Turkey and Saudi Arabia, have been less involved in these measures.

By 2026, the EMEA region has intensified its focus on "near-shoring" to enhance supply chain resilience against geopolitical volatility. Major European manufacturers have increasingly shifted production to hubs in Central and Eastern Europe as well as North Africa to shorten lead times and mitigate transport costs. In the technology sector, IT spending across EMEA is projected to grow by 7% in 2026, driven by a shift from AI experimentation to operational deployment at scale, particularly in industrial and enterprise applications. This trend is further supported by the expansion of regional logistics trackers that monitor the impact of policy shifts on international business investment.

== See also ==
- Americas
- Asia–Pacific
- MENA
- List of country groupings
