= Great power =

Nation that has great political, social, and economic influence on a global scale

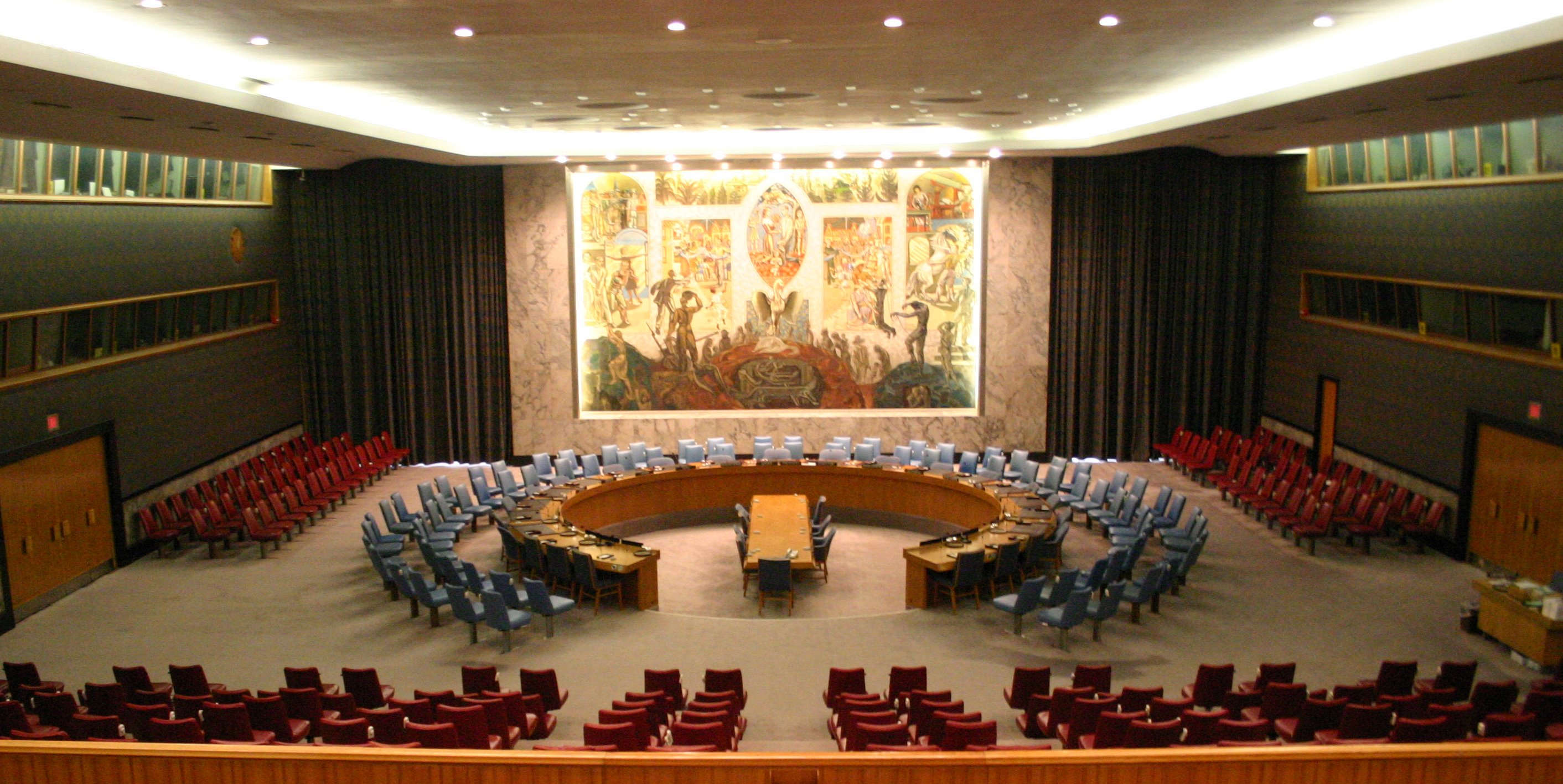
Great powers are recognized in several international structures, including the United Nations Security Council.

A great power is a sovereign state that is recognized as having the ability and expertise to exert its influence on a global scale. Great powers characteristically possess military and economic strength, as well as diplomatic and soft power influence, which may cause middle or small powers to consider the great powers' opinions before taking actions of their own. International relations theorists have posited that great power status can be characterized into power capabilities, spatial aspects, and status dimensions.

While some nations are widely considered to be great powers, there is considerable debate on the exact criteria for great power status. Historically, great powers have been formally recognized as members of organizations such as the Congress of Vienna of 1814–1815 or the United Nations Security Council, of which the permanent members are China, France, Russia, the United Kingdom, and the United States. The United Nations Security Council, NATO Quint, the G7, BRICS, and the Contact Group have all been described as great power concerts.

The term "great power" was first used to describe the most important powers in Europe during the post-Napoleonic era. The "Great Powers" constituted the "Concert of Europe" and claimed the right to joint enforcement of the postwar treaties. The formalization of the division between small powers and great powers came about with the signing of the Treaty of Chaumont in 1814. Since then, the international balance of power has shifted numerous times, most dramatically during World War I and World War II. In literature, world power and major power are often used as synonyms for "great power".

== Characteristics ==
There are no set or defined characteristics of a great power. Analysts have often regarded any such characteristics as empirical, self-evident to the assessor. However, this approach has the disadvantage of subjectivity. As a result, theorists have made attempts to derive some common criteria and to treat these as essential elements of great-power status. Danilovic (2002) highlights three central characteristics: "power, spatial, and status dimensions", that distinguish major powers from other states. The following discussion on characteristics is extracted from her discussion of these three dimensions, including all of the citations.

Early writings on the subject tended to judge states by the realist criterion, as expressed by the historian A. J. P. Taylor when he noted that "the test of a great power is the test of strength for war". Later writers have expanded this test, attempting to define power in terms of overall military, economic, and political capacity. Kenneth Waltz, the founder of the neorealist theory of international relations, uses a set of six criteria to determine great-power status: population and territory, resource endowment, military strength, economic capability, political stability and competence.

John Mearsheimer defined great powers as those that "have sufficient military assets to put up a serious fight in an all-out conventional war against the most powerful state in the world".

=== Power dimensions ===
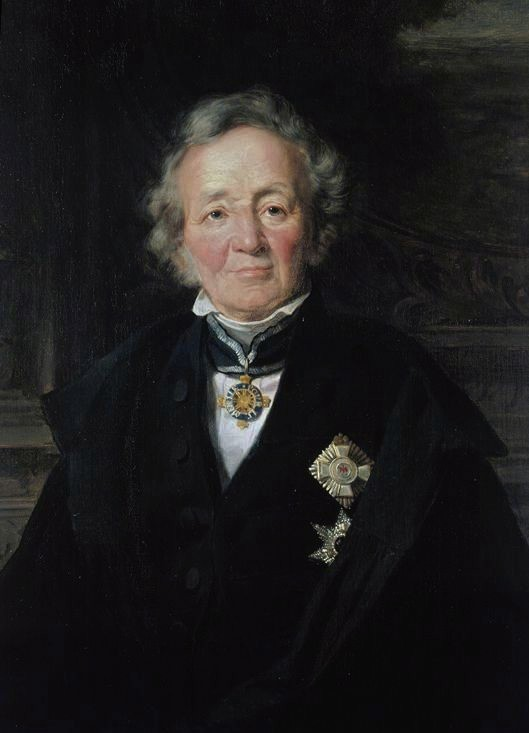
In the mid-19th century, German historian Leopold von Ranke attempted to scientifically document the great powers.

As noted above, for many, power capabilities are the sole criterion. Even under more expansive tests, power retains a vital place.

This aspect has received mixed treatment, with some confusion as to the degree of power required. Writers have approached the concept of "great power" with differing conceptualizations of the world situation, from multi-polarity to overwhelming hegemony. In his essay, "French Diplomacy in the Postwar Period", the French historian Jean-Baptiste Duroselle spoke of the concept of multi-polarity: "A Great power is one which is capable of preserving its own independence against any other single power."

This attitude differed from that of earlier writers, notably Leopold von Ranke (1795–1886), who clearly had a different idea of the world situation in his day. In his essay "The Great Powers" (German: Die grossen Mächte), written in 1833, von Ranke wrote: "If one could establish as a definition of a Great power that it must be able to maintain itself against all others, even when they are united, then Frederick has raised Prussia to that position." These positions have attracted criticism.

In 2011, the United States of America had 10 major strengths according to Chinese scholar Peng Yuan, the director of the Institute of American Studies of the China Institutes for Contemporary International Studies.

1. Population, geographic position, and natural resources
2. Military muscle
3. High technology and education
4. Cultural/soft power
5. Cyber power
6. Allies, the United States having more than any other state
7. Geopolitical strength, as embodied in global projection forces
8. Intelligence capabilities, as demonstrated by the 2011 killing of Osama bin Laden
9. Intellectual power, fed by a plethora of US think-tanks and the "revolving door" between research institutions and government
10. Strategic power, the United States being the world's only country with a truly global strategy

However he also noted where the US had recently slipped:

1. Political power, as manifested by the breakdown of bipartisanship
2. Economic power, as illustrated by the post-2007 slowdown
3. Financial power, given intractable deficits and rising debt
4. Social power, as weakened by societal polarization
5. Institutional power, since the United States can no longer dominate global institutions

=== Spatial dimension ===
All states have a geographic scope of interests, actions, or projected power. This is a crucial factor in distinguishing a great power from a regional power; by definition, the scope of a regional power is restricted to its region. It has been suggested that a great power should be possessed of actual influence throughout the scope of the prevailing international system. Arnold J. Toynbee, for example, observes that "Great power may be defined as a political force exerting an effect co-extensive with the widest range of the society in which it operates. The Great powers of 1914 were 'world-powers' because Western society had recently become 'world-wide'."

Other suggestions have been made that a great power should have the capacity to engage in extra-regional affairs and that a great power ought to be possessed of extra-regional interests, two often closely-connected propositions.

=== Status dimension ===
Formal or informal acknowledgment of a nation's great-power status has also been a criterion for identifying a great power. As political scientist George Modelski notes, "The status of Great power is sometimes confused with the condition of being powerful. The office, as it is known, did in fact evolve from the role played by the great military states in earlier periods... But the Great power system institutionalizes the position of the powerful state in a web of rights and obligations."

Modelski's approach restricts analysis to the epoch following the 1814-1815 Congress of Vienna at which great powers were first formally recognized. In the absence of such a formal act of recognition it has been suggested that great-power status can arise by implication by judging the nature of a state's relations with other great powers.

A further option is to examine a state's willingness to act as a great power. As a country will seldom declare that it is acting as such, this usually entails a retrospective examination of state conduct. As a result, this is of limited use in establishing the nature of contemporary powers, at least not without the exercise of subjective observation.

Other important criteria throughout history are that great powers should have enough influence to be included in discussions of contemporary political and diplomatic questions, and exercise influence on the outcome and resolution. Historically, when major political questions were addressed, several powers met to discuss them. Before the era of groups like the United Nations, participants of such meetings were not officially named but rather were decided based on their implied great-power status. These were conferences that settled important questions based on major historical events. (Note: The 1648 Peace of Westphalia would qualify. The 325 First Council of Nicaea might also fit the definition.)

=== "Full-spectrum" dimension ===
Historian Phillips O'Brien, Head of the School of International Relations and Professor of Strategic Studies at the University of St. Andrews, criticizes the concept of a great power, arguing that it is dated, vaguely defined, and inconsistently applied. He states that the term is used to "describe everything from true superpowers such as the United States and China, which wield the full spectrum of economic, technological, and military might, to better-than-average military powers such as Russia, which have nuclear weapons but little else that would be considered indicators of great power. " O'Brien advocates for the concept of a "full-spectrum power", which takes into account "all the fundamentals on which superior military power is built", including economic resources, domestic politics and political systems (which can restrain or expand dimensions of power), technological capabilities, and social and cultural factors (such as a society's willingness to go to war or to invest in military development). (Note: Both monocultural and multicultural societies may have advantages – note the changing fortunes of the great-power blocs in the course of World War II.)

== History ==
=== Pre-modern descriptions ===
Various sets of great, or significant, powers have existed throughout history. An early reference to great powers is from the third century, when the Persian prophet Mani described Rome, China, Aksum, and Persia as the four greatest kingdoms of his time.

=== Modern concept ===
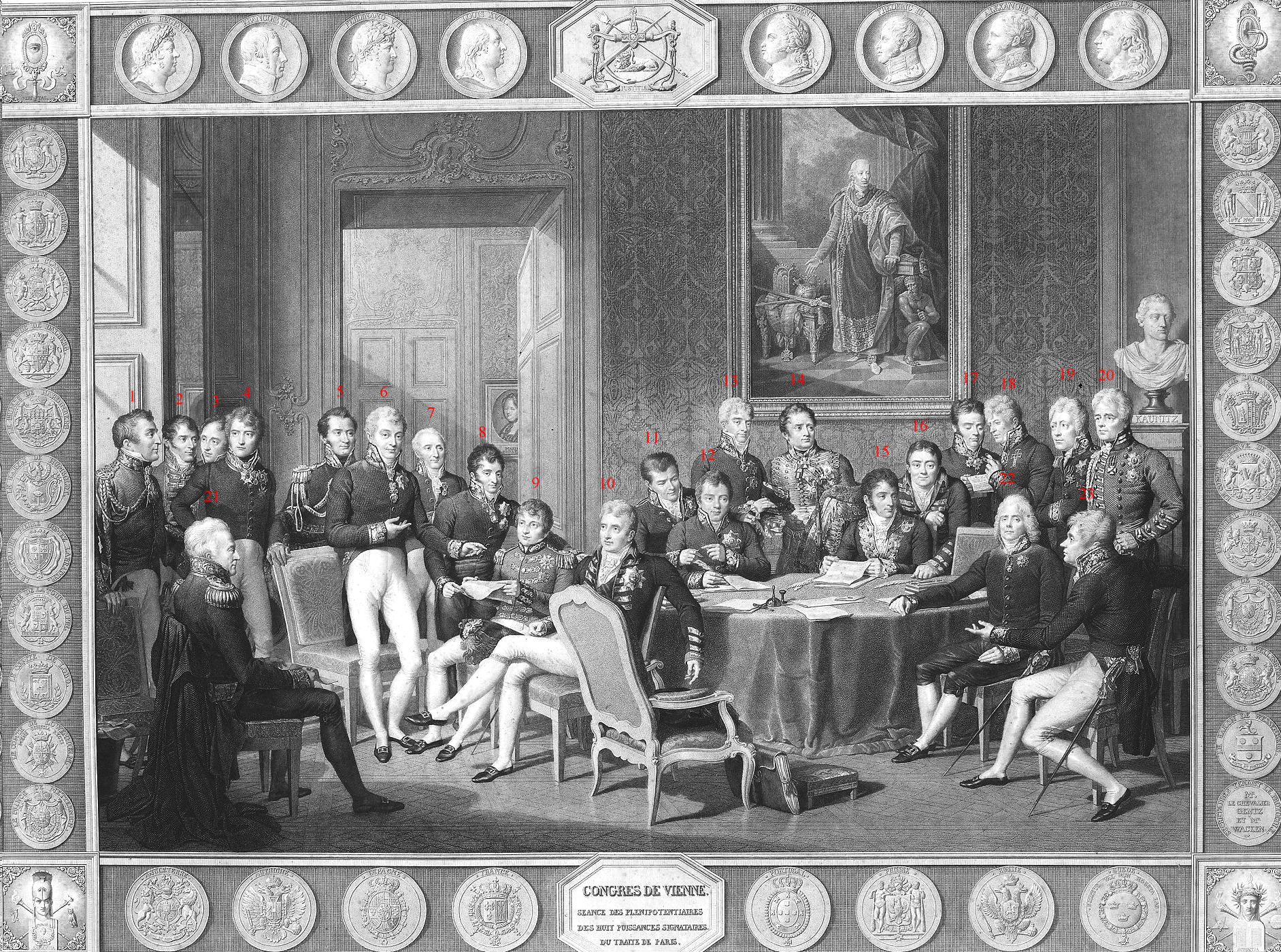
The Congress of Vienna, an 1819 portrait by Jean-Baptiste Isabey depicting the Congress of Vienna

The term "great power" first appears at the Congress of Vienna in 1815. The Congress established the Concert of Europe as an attempt to preserve peace after the years of Napoleonic Wars. During the Napoleonic wars in Europe, American diplomat James Monroe observed that, "The respect which one power has for another is in exact proportion of the means which they respectively have of injuring each other."

Lord Castlereagh, the British foreign secretary, first used the term in its diplomatic context, writing on 13 February 1814: "there is every prospect of the Congress terminating with a general accord and Guarantee between the Great powers of Europe, with a determination to support the arrangement agreed upon, and to turn the general influence and if necessary the general arms against the Power that shall first attempt to disturb the Continental peace."

The Congress of Vienna consisted of five main powers: Austria, France, Prussia, Russia, and Great Britain. These five primary participants constituted the original great powers as we know the term today. Other powers, such as Spain, Portugal, and Sweden, which were great powers during the 16th, 17th and 18th century, were consulted on certain specific issues, but they were not full participants.

After the Congress of Vienna, Great Britain emerged as the pre-eminent global hegemon, due to it being the first nation to industrialize, possessing the largest navy, and the extent of its overseas empire, which ushered in a century of Pax Britannica. The balance of power between the Great Powers became a major influence in European politics, prompting Otto von Bismarck to say "All politics reduces itself to this formula: try to be one of three, as long as the world is governed by the unstable equilibrium of five great powers."

Over time, the relative power of these five nations fluctuated, which by the dawn of the 20th century had served to create an entirely different balance of power. Great Britain and the new German Empire (from 1871), experienced continued economic growth and political power. Others, such as Russia and Austria-Hungary, stagnated. At the same time, other states were emerging and expanding in power, largely through the process of industrialization. These countries seeking to attain great power status were: Italy after the Risorgimento era, Japan during the Meiji era, and the United States after its civil war. By 1900, the balance of world power had changed substantially since the Congress of Vienna. The Eight-Nation Alliance was an alliance of eight nations created in response to the Boxer Rebellion in China. It formed in 1900 and consisted of the five Congress powers plus Italy, Japan, and the United States, representing the great powers at the beginning of the 20th century.

=== World wars ===
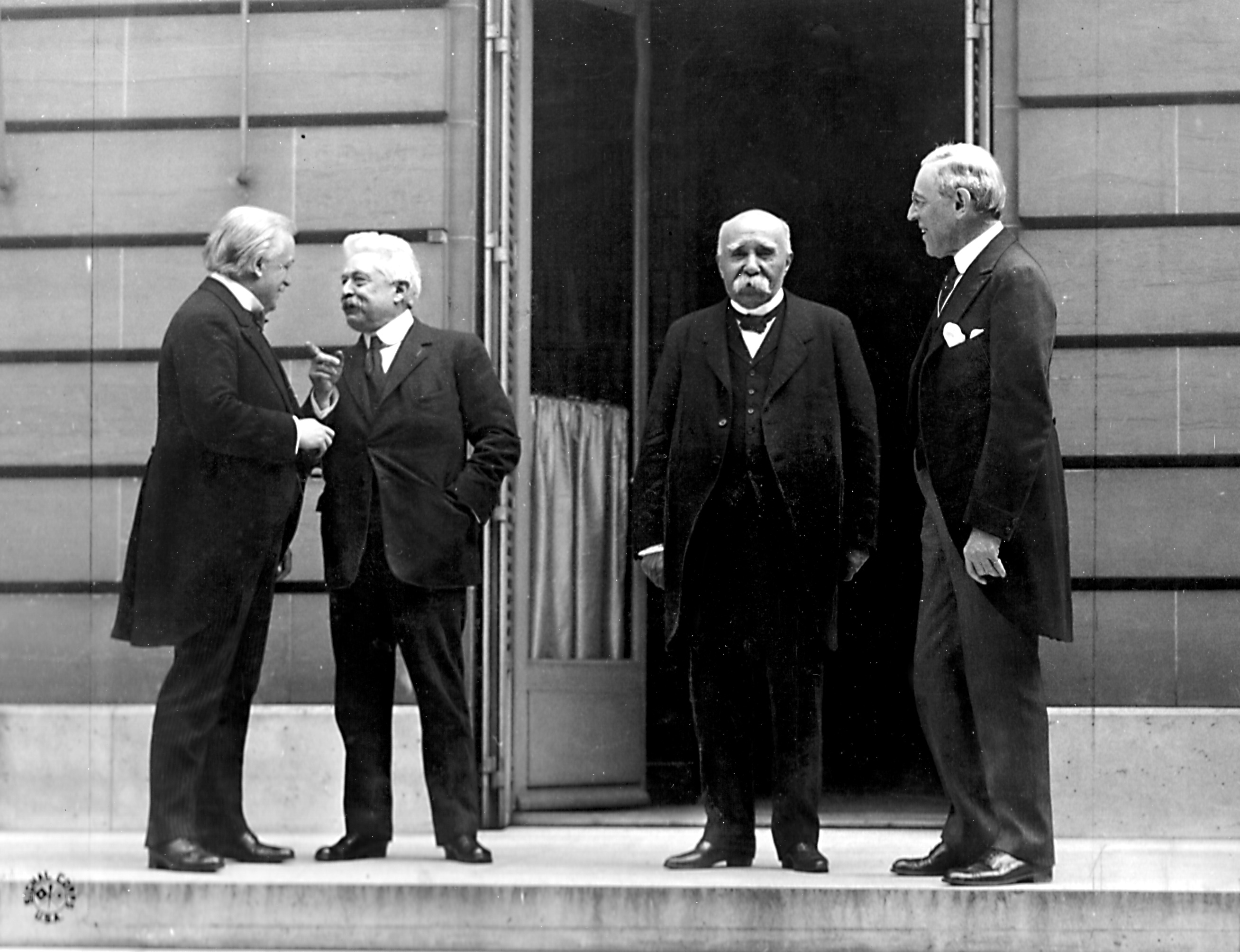
The "Big Four" at the Paris Peace Conference of 1919: David Lloyd George, Vittorio Emanuele Orlando, Georges Clemenceau, and Woodrow Wilson

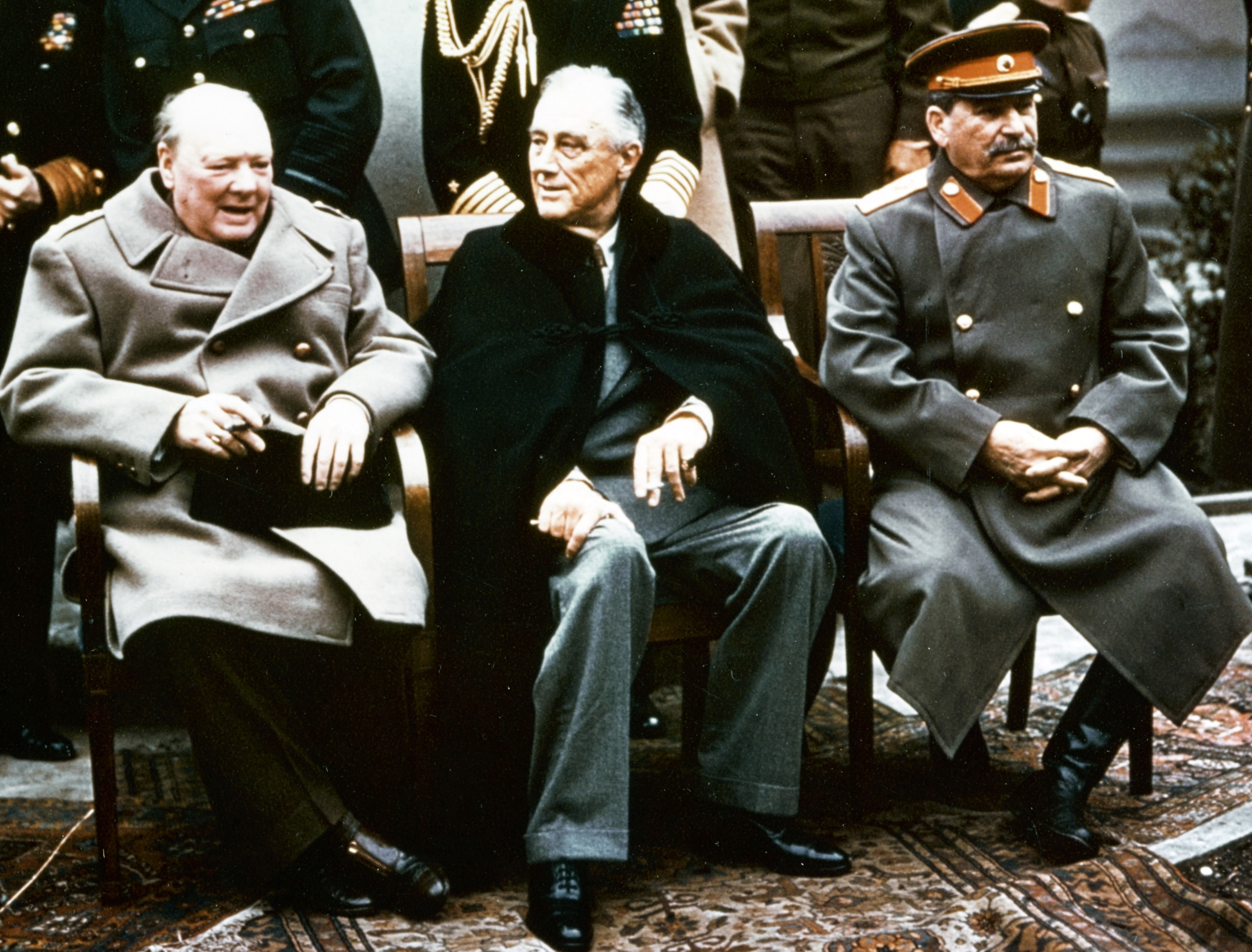
The "Big Three" of Europe at the Yalta Conference: Winston Churchill, Franklin D. Roosevelt, and Joseph Stalin

The Allied leaders of the Asian and Pacific Theatre: Chiang Kai-shek, Franklin D. Roosevelt, and Winston Churchill at the Cairo Conference in 1943

Shifts of international power have most notably occurred through major conflicts. The conclusion of World War I and the resulting treaties of Versailles, St-Germain, Neuilly, Trianon, and Sèvres made Great Britain, France, Italy, Japan, and the United States the chief arbiters of the new world order. The German Empire was defeated, Austria-Hungary was divided into new, less powerful states and the Russian Empire fell to revolution. During the Paris Peace Conference, the "Big Four" – Great Britain, France, Italy, and the United States – controlled the proceedings and outcome of the treaties more than Japan. The Big Four were the architects of the Treaty of Versailles, which was signed by Germany; the Treaty of St. Germain, with Austria; the Treaty of Neuilly, with Bulgaria; the Treaty of Trianon, with Hungary; and the Treaty of Sèvres, with the Ottoman Empire. During the decision-making of the Treaty of Versailles, Italy pulled out of the conference because a part of its demands were not met and temporarily left the other three countries as the sole major architects of that treaty, referred to as the "Big Three".

The status of the victorious great powers was recognised by permanent seats at the League of Nations Council, where they acted as a type of executive body directing the Assembly of the League. However, the council began with only four permanent members – Great Britain, France, Italy, and Japan – because the United States, meant to be the fifth permanent member, never joined the League. Germany later joined after the Locarno Treaties, which made it a member of the League of Nations, and later left (and withdrew from the League in 1933); Japan left, and the Soviet Union joined.

When World War II began in 1939, it divided the world into two alliances: the Allies (initially the United Kingdom and France, and Poland, followed in 1941 by the Soviet Union, China, and the United States) and the Axis powers (Germany, Italy, and Japan). (Note: Even though the book The Economics of World War II lists seven great powers at the start of 1939 (Great Britain, Japan, France, Italy, Nazi Germany, the Soviet Union, and the United States), it focuses only on six of them, because France surrendered shortly after the war began.) During the war, the US, UK, USSR, and China were referred as a "trusteeship of the powerful" and were recognized as the Allied "Big Four" in Declaration by United Nations in 1942. These four countries were referred as the "Four Policemen" of the Allies and considered as the primary victors of World War II. The importance of France was acknowledged by their inclusion, along with the other four, in the group of countries allotted permanent seats in the United Nations Security Council.

Since the world wars, the term "great power" has been joined by a number of other power classifications. Foremost among these is the concept of the "superpower", used to describe those nations with overwhelming power and influence in the world. It was first coined in 1944 by William T. R. Fox and according to him there were three superpowers: Great Britain, the United States, and the Soviet Union. Britain lost its superpower status after World War II. The term middle power has emerged for nations that exercise a degree of global influence, but not sufficiently to be decisive on international affairs. Regional powers are those whose influence is generally confined to their region of the world.

=== Cold War ===
The Cold War was a period of geopolitical tension between the United States and the Soviet Union and their respective allies, the Western Bloc and the Eastern Bloc, which began following World War II. The term "cold" is used because there was no large-scale fighting directly between the two superpowers, but they each supported major regional conflicts known as proxy wars. The conflict was based around the ideological and geopolitical struggle for global influence by these two superpowers, following their temporary alliance and victory against Nazi Germany in 1945.

During the Cold War, Japan, France, the United Kingdom and West Germany rebuilt their economies. France and the United Kingdom maintained technologically advanced armed forces with power projection capabilities and maintain large defense budgets to this day. Yet, as the Cold War continued, authorities began to question if France and the United Kingdom could retain their long-held status as great powers. China, which until 2021, had held the world's largest population, has slowly risen to great power status, with large growth in economic and military power in the post-war period. After 1949, the Republic of China began to lose its recognition as the sole legitimate government of China by the other great powers, in favor of the People's Republic of China. Subsequently, in 1971, it lost its permanent seat at the UN Security Council to the People's Republic of China.

=== Aftermath of the Cold War ===
China, France, Russia, the United Kingdom, and the United States are often referred to as great powers by academics due to "their political and economic dominance of the global arena". These five nations are the only states to have permanent seats with veto power on the UN Security Council. They are also the only state entities to have met the conditions to be considered "Nuclear Weapons States" under the Treaty on the Non-Proliferation of Nuclear Weapons, and maintain military expenditures which are among the largest in the world. However, there is no unanimous agreement among authorities as to the current status of these powers or what precisely defines a great power. For example, following the Cold War and the two decades after it, some sources referred to China, France, Russia and the United Kingdom as middle powers. Following the dissolution of the Soviet Union, its UN Security Council permanent seat was transferred to the Russian Federation in 1991, as its largest successor state. The newly formed Russian Federation emerged on the level of a great power, leaving the United States as the only remaining global superpower. (Note: The fall of the Berlin Wall and the breakup of the Soviet Union left the United States as the only remaining superpower in the 1990s, although some support a multipolar world view.) In the 2020s, China has been frequently described as exceeding the criteria of a great power and currently representing a superpower along with the United States.

Although Russia is commonly thought to be a great power, subsequent to Russia's military's underperformance in the Russo-Ukrainian war and factors such as the negative effects it has had on Russia's economic and technological strength, geopolitics expert George Friedman, an article in Foreign Affairs magazine and academic journal articles have indicated that Russia is no longer a great power. Kathryn E. Stoner's 2021 book Russia Resurrected. Its Power and Purpose in a New Global Order published by Oxford University Press argues that Russia is not a great power in the traditional understanding of the term, but is instead a disruptor/challenger to the current international system. The historian Stephen Kotkin and the international relations scholar John Mearsheimer have both remarked that Russia is a "weak great power". In addition, in 2014, Mearsheimer said: "Russia is a declining power, and it will only get weaker with time."

Germany and Japan are widely considered great powers as well, due in large part to their highly advanced economies (as the two have the third and fifth largest economies by nominal GDP respectively) rather than their strategic and hard power capabilities (i.e., the lack of permanent seats and veto power on the UN Security Council or strategic military reach). Germany has been a member together with the five permanent Security Council members in the P5+1 grouping of world powers. Like China, France, Russia, and the United Kingdom; Germany and Japan have also been referred to as middle powers. In his 2014 publication Great Power Peace and American Primacy, Joshua Baron considers China, France, Russia, Germany, Japan, the United Kingdom, and the United States as the current great powers.

Italy has been referred to as a great power by a number of academics and commentators throughout the post-WWII era. The American international legal scholar Milena Sterio writes:

The great powers are super-sovereign states: an exclusive club of the most powerful states economically, militarily, politically and strategically. These states include veto-wielding members of the United Nations Security Council (United States, United Kingdom, France, China, and Russia), as well as economic powerhouses such as Germany, Italy and Japan.

Sterio also cites Italy's status in the Group of Seven (G7) and the nation's influence in regional and international organizations for its status as a great power. Italy has been a member together with the five permanent Security Council members plus Germany in the International Support Group for Lebanon (ISG) grouping of world powers. Some analysts assert that Italy is an "intermittent" or the "Least of the Great Powers", while some others believe Italy is a middle or regional power.

International relations academics Gabriele Abbondanza and Thomas Wilkins have classified Italy as an "awkward" great power on account of its top-tier economic, military, political, and socio-cultural capabilities and credentials – including its G7 and NATO Quint membership – which are moderated by its lack of national nuclear weapons and permanent membership to the UN Security Council.

In addition to these contemporary great powers mentioned above, Zbigniew Brzezinski considered India to be a great power. However, there is no collective agreement among observers as to the status of India, for example, a number of academics believe that India is emerging as a great power, while some believe that India remains a middle power.

The United Nations Security Council, NATO Quint, G7, BRICS, and Contact Group are all considered concerts of great power among others.

A 2017 study by the Hague Centre for Strategic Studies qualified China, Europe, India, Japan, Russia, and the United States as the current great powers.

=== Emerging powers ===
With continuing European integration, the European Union is increasingly being seen as a great power in its own right, with representation at the WTO and at G7 and G-20 summits. This is most notable in areas where the European Union has exclusive competence (i.e. economic affairs). It also reflects a non-traditional conception of Europe's world role as a global "civilian power", exercising collective influence in the functional spheres of trade and diplomacy, as an alternative to military dominance. The European Union is a supranational union and not a sovereign state and does not have its own foreign affairs or defence policies; these remain largely with the member states, which include France, Germany and, before Brexit, the United Kingdom (referred to collectively as the "EU three").

Brazil and India are widely regarded as emerging powers with the potential to be great powers. Political scientist Stephen P. Cohen asserts that India is an emerging power, also highlights that some strategists consider India to be already a great power. Some academics such as Zbigniew Brzezinski and David A. Robinson already regard India as a major or great power. Former British Ambassador to Brazil, Peter Collecott identifies that Brazil's recognition as a potential great and superpower largely stems from its own national identity and ambition. Professor Kwang Ho Chun feels that Brazil will emerge as a great power with an important position in some spheres of influence. Others suggest India and Brazil may even have the potential to emerge as a superpower.

Permanent membership of the UN Security Council is widely regarded as being a central tenet of great power status in the modern world; Brazil, Germany, India and Japan form the G4 nations which support one another (and have varying degrees of support from the existing permanent members) in becoming permanent members. The G4 is opposed by the Italian-led Uniting for Consensus group. There are however few signs that reform of the Security Council will happen in the near future.

== See also ==
- Big Four (Western Europe)
- Diplomatic history of World War I
- Diplomatic history of World War II
  - History of United States foreign policy
  - History of French foreign relations
  - History of Japanese foreign relations
  - History of German foreign policy
  - Foreign policy of the Russian Empire
  - Foreign relations of the Soviet Union
  - Historiography of the British Empire
  - History of the foreign relations of the United Kingdom
- Failed state
- G8
- Historic recurrence
- International relations (1648–1814)
- International relations (1814–1919)
- International relations (1919–1939)
- List of ancient great powers
- List of medieval great powers
- List of modern great powers
- Power (international relations)
- Precedence among European monarchies
- Hyperpower
- Superpower
- Regional power
- Middle Power
- Small power
