= EU4 (disambiguation) =

EU4 can refer to the following:

- Europa Universalis IV, a computer game by Paradox Interactive.
- Haplogroup E1b1b (Y-DNA) in human genetics, previously known as EU4.
- Big Four (Western Europe), four major European powers, also known as EU4.
