= Readiness 2030 =

European strategic defence initiative

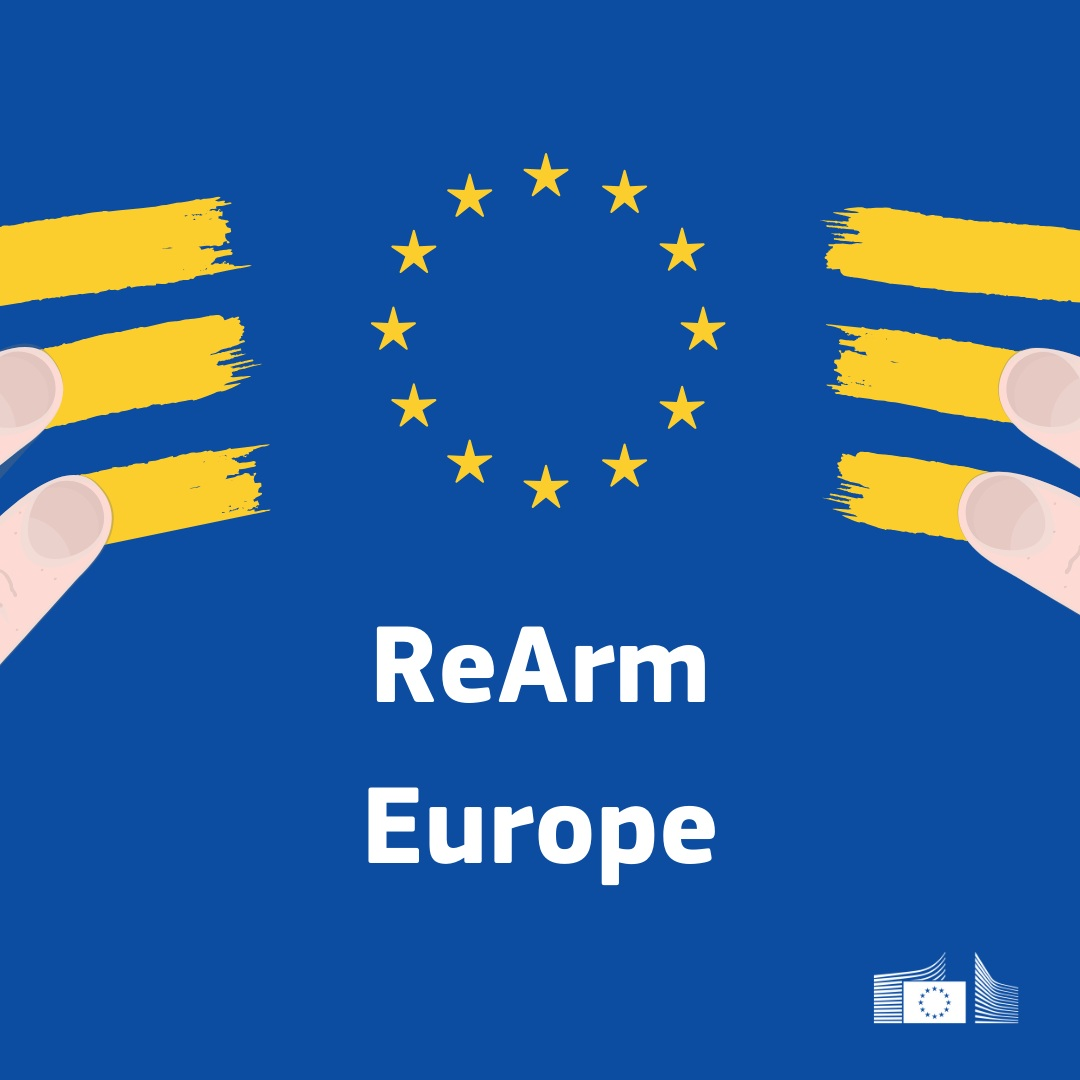
Image of the ReArm Europe initiative posted by the European Commission on social media

Readiness 2030 (formerly ReArm Europe) is a strategic defence initiative proposed by European Commission president Ursula von der Leyen on 4 March 2025, aimed at enhancing the European Union's military capabilities. It was unveiled in a letter to European leaders ahead of a European Council meeting on 6 March 2025. The plan seeks to mobilise up to €800 billion to strengthen Europe's defence infrastructure in response to geopolitical threats, notably the ongoing war in Ukraine and uncertainties over U.S. military support. Following criticism from Italian prime minister Giorgia Meloni and Spanish prime minister Pedro Sánchez, the initiative was rebranded as Readiness 2030.

== Background ==
Announced amid heightened security concerns, the plan addresses the need for Europe to reduce reliance on external allies, particularly following the U.S. suspension of military aid to Ukraine.

Following recent discussions, including a 2025 London Summit on Ukraine two days prior to the announcement, European capitals have signalled a unified commitment to massively increase defence investments. The Readiness 2030 plan is structured around five key components designed to mobilise both public and private resources, with an estimated potential to unlock nearly €800 billion for European security over the coming years.

Von der Leyen emphasised the urgency of rearming Europe, calling it a response to "a clear and present danger" unprecedented in recent decades.

In the aftermath of the 2025 speech from the throne, delivered on 27 May 2025, the Canadian government committed to joining the initiative.

== Components ==
The initiative consists of five key measures:

1. Fiscal Flexibility: Suspend EU budget rules to allow member states to increase defence spending, potentially unlocking €650 billion over four years.
2. Defence Loans: Offer €150 billion in loans for joint defence projects, such as air and missile defence systems.
3. Budget Repurposing: Redirect existing EU funds, like cohesion funds, toward defence investments.
4. European Investment Bank (EIB) Role: Lift EIB lending restrictions to support defence firms.
5. Savings Union: Create a mechanism to mobilise private capital for defence, boosting investment in the sector.

== Objectives ==
The plan aims to enhance Europe's self-reliance in defence, support Ukraine militarily, and prepare for uncertainty in relations with the United States. It will first focus on collective procurement and investment in critical European needs, like drones and artillery technologies.

== See also ==
- List of countries in Europe by military expenditures
- Russia–European Union relations
- Ukraine–European Union relations
- European Union–United States relations
- Multinational Force–Ukraine – Proposed force for peace enforcement
- Operation Interflex – British training mission in Ukraine
- Operation Unifier – Canadian Armed Forces operation in Ukraine
- Ukraine Defense Contact Group – Defensive alliance against 2022 Russian invasion of Ukraine
- Weimar+ – Intergovernmental alliance of EU nations and the UK
