= E5 (European Group of Five) =

Intergovernmental alliance of biggest European defence spenders

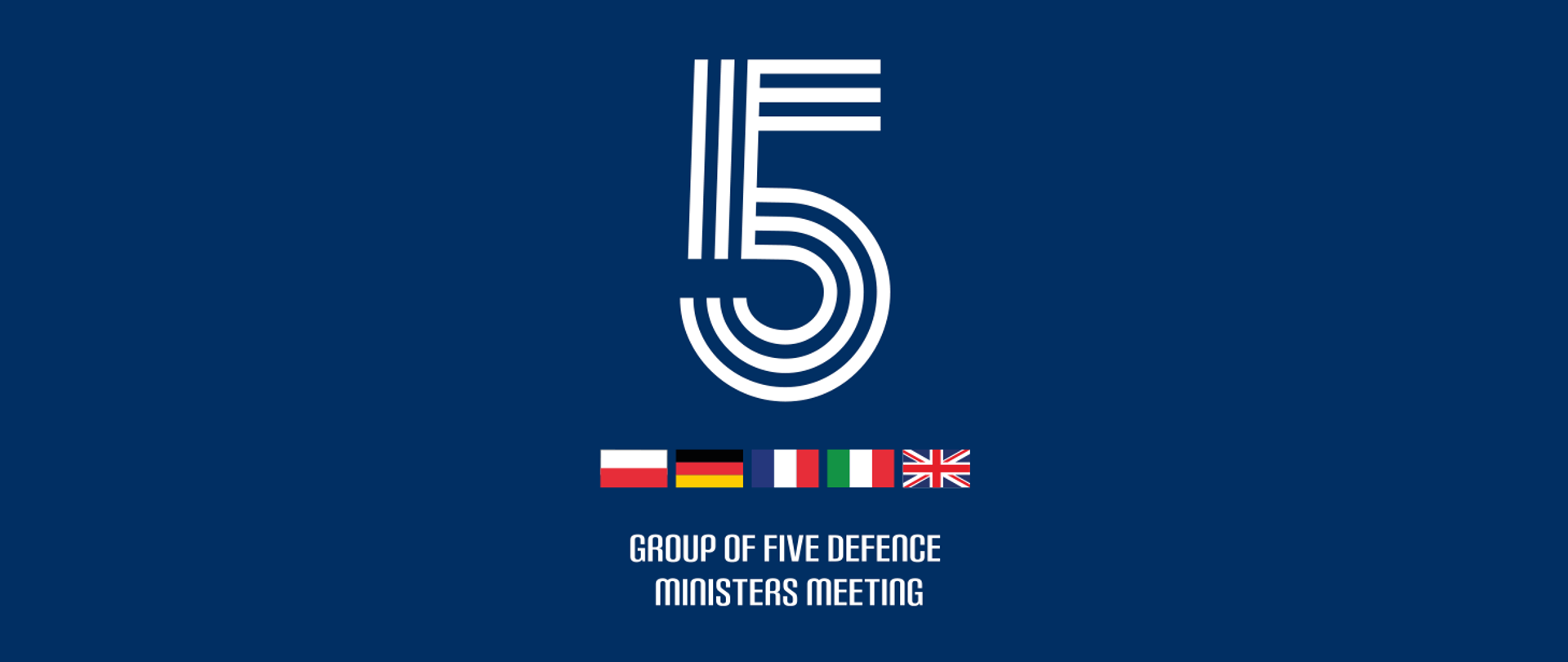
E5 Logo

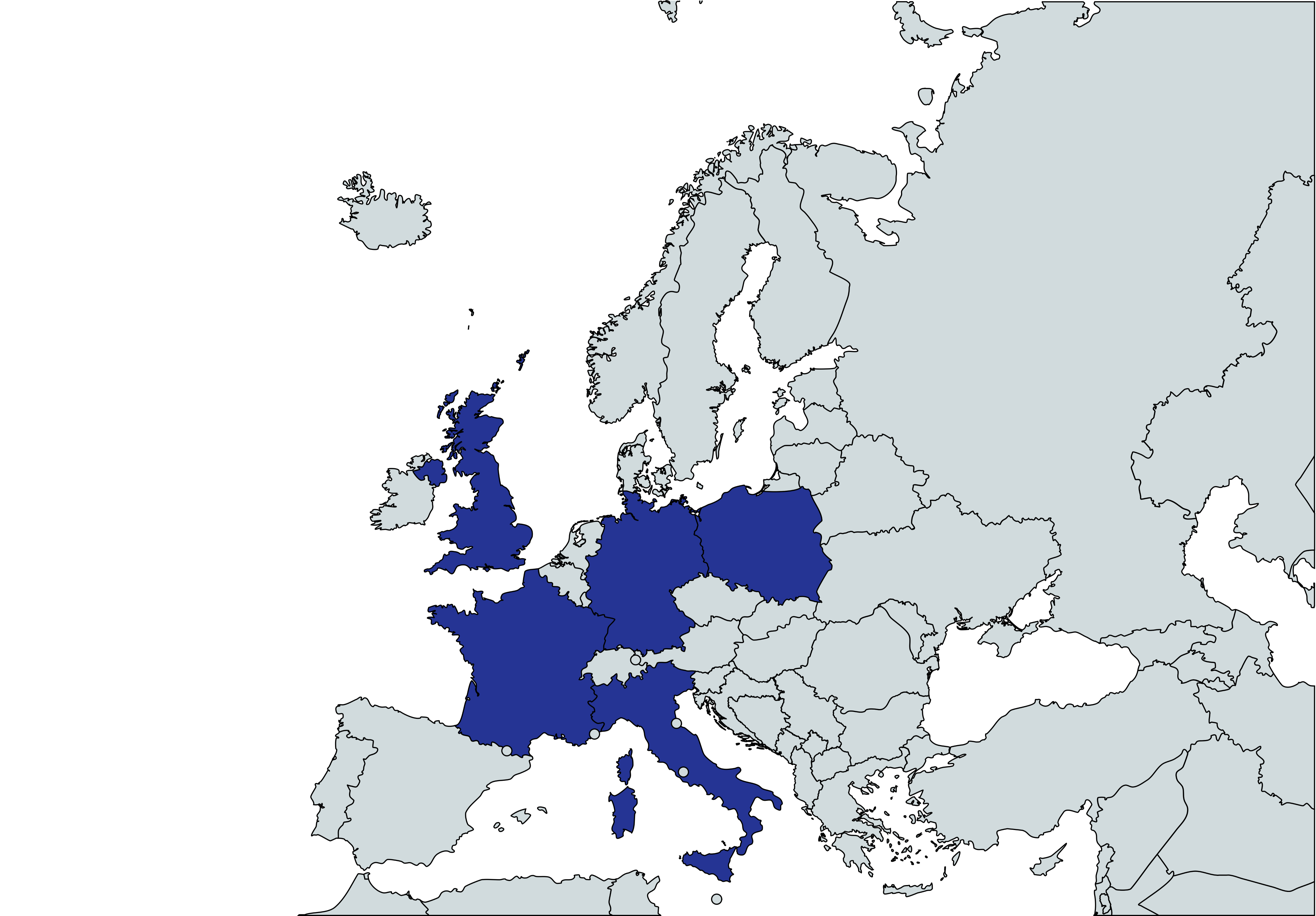
E5 members

The European Group of Five (E5) is a meeting of the defence ministers of Europe's five biggest defence spenders and largest military powers.

It was inaugurated in November 2024 in response to increased calls for European rearmament and increased leadership by Europe in providing support to Ukraine. Since its inauguration the E5 has met seven times (five times in 2025), and pledged to deepen cooperation across a number of areas. Representatives from NATO and the EU are usually also present at meetings of the format.

It is similar in provenance and purpose to the Weimar+ format which it pre-dates, but without including Spain, due to their low defence spending. Commentators have discussed the format "increasingly becoming the relevant forum to strengthen political and military cooperation on the continent."

Discussion of the E5 has also increasingly focused on elevating it to a leader level forum to better coordinate European defence, complimentary to larger groups like the EU and NATO. At the end of June 2026, German Chancellor Friedrich Merz is convening E5 leaders in Berlin for the first time. The goal being to form a common position ahead of the 2026 Ankara NATO summit.

It has been proposed by some, including EU Commissioner for Defence and Space Andrius Kubilius that the E5 become an “informal security council” for Europe.

== History ==
=== Initial formation ===
The E5 first met on 25 November 2024 in Berlin, convened by German defence minister Boris Pistorius and dubbed 'the E5' by British secretary of state for defence John Healey. At the meeting the five Ministers pledged to 'close the capabilities gap', as well as pledging continued and increasing support to Ukraine and to 'keep the Ukraine Defense Contact Group alive'.

The second meeting in Poland saw the first E5 joint statement published. In it the group restated their support for Ukraine and the Ukraine Defense Contact Group, pledged to build cooperation on this between NATO, the EU and national governments, and urged their defence industries to step up their cooperation with Ukrainian defence industry. Secondly the group restated its support for the transatlantic alliance and urged greater financial support and information exchange to improve defence capability and procurement.

The third meeting of the E5 took place in Paris in March 2025. The E5 Ministers focussed on pledges to cut regulations to encourage greater production by their defence industries, calling for an assessment of EU regulations and national laws that could "hinder or slow down" weapons production and procurement.

Over the fourth meeting in Rome the key priorities for the E5 remained "continued support for Ukraine, the strengthening of Europe’s industrial and operational capabilities, and the shared goal of achieving greater European strategic autonomy, in full synergy with NATO and the European Union."

The fifth meeting of the format in London in September 2025 was dominated by discussion of the 2025 Russian drone incursion into Poland which occurred over the preceding days.

=== Rising profile ===
November 2025 saw the sixth meeting of the format and its first anniversary in Berlin. This meeting saw an emphasis on continuity of policy ahead of Ukraine entering the fourth winter of the Russian invasion. All Ministers emphasised that backing for Kyiv would remain open-ended, that hybrid threats against Europe are accelerating, and that as the continent’s biggest military powers they intended to take on a larger share of their own defence. The meeting also saw the announcement of the first E5 joint deployment, to Bosnia Hercegovina, by British secretary of state John Healey.

The seventh meeting of the format in Kraków, Poland, saw the announcement of the Low-Cost Effectors and Autonomous Platforms (LEAP) initiative by the E5. This pledged to jointly develop and produce new low cost drones within the next year. British minister Luke Pollard elaborated that, "The problem is to be effective at shooting down relatively low-cost missiles, drones and other threats facing us," Pollard told reporters. "We need to make sure that we're matching the cost of the threats with the cost of defense," adding that the drone initiative entailed a new "multimillion-euro" commitment from the five countries.

The group continued close cooperation through the 2026 Iran war on a common European response. On the 11th March the group met virtually to take stock of the situation and coordinate diplomatic efforts, ensuring that the Middle East situation didn't impact the continuity of E5 support for Ukraine.

The E5 met virtually again on 12 June to coordinate ahead of the 2026 Ankara NATO summit, with discussion focusing on a common strategy to enhance the European contribution to the Alliance within the framework of transatlantic relations.

At an in-person meeting of the E5 heads of government in Berlin on June 25, 2026, the state of the Iran War and a potential European mission in the Strait of Hormuz were discussed. Moreover, Italy and Poland re-iterated their push towards empowering the E5 by shifting weight away from the E3 format (Germany, France, and UK).

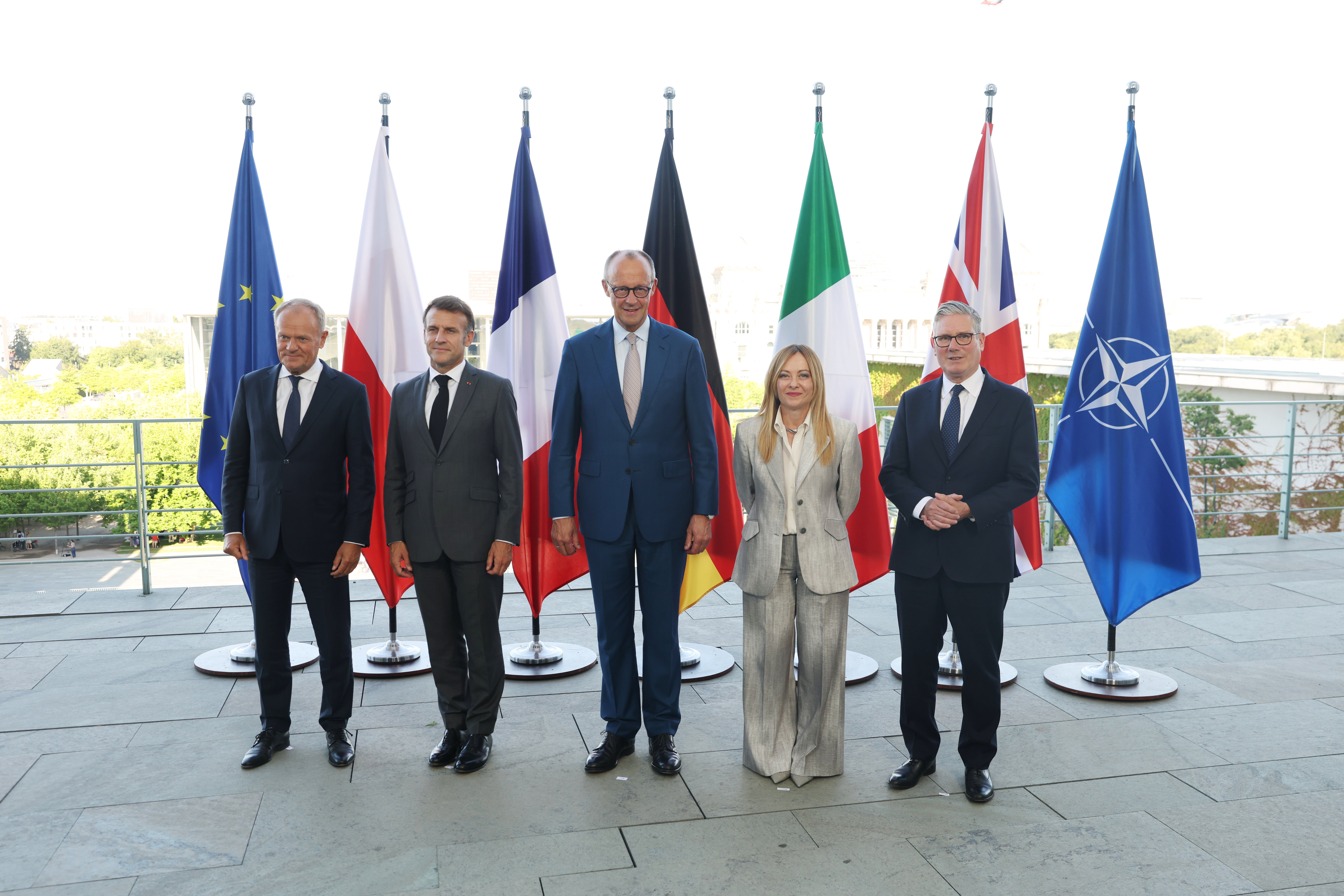
The E5 heads of government in Berlin in June 2026

== Areas of focus and joint operations ==
The E5 has thus far been largely focused on two major areas: continuing support for Ukraine and scoping options for streamlining procurement standards and procedures across defence industry.

Industrially in February 2026 the E5 announced a joint programme of development and manufacture of low cost drones (the Low-Cost Effectors and Autonomous Platforms (LEAP) initiative). To result in new low cost effectors being developed and manufactured within the next year.

The E5 has also taken part in joint operations, with the groups first joint deployment as part of a British-led operation in Bosnia Hercegovina announced at the sixth meeting of the format in November 2025. British defence secretary John Healey announced that 'All of the E5 countries will be involved in the deployment to Bosnia and Herzegovina to boost security and stability in the region. A new era of threat requires a new era for defence, which is why the UK is stepping up alongside European partners to deter aggression and invest in security."

== List of in-person meetings ==
Overview of in-person E5 meetings
#	Date	Host	Level	Host minister	Location held	Notes
1st	25 November 2024	Germany	Defence Ministers	Boris Pistorius	Berlin	Inaugural E5 meeting.
2nd	13 January 2025	Poland	Defence Ministers	Władysław Kosiniak-Kamysz	Helenów, near Warsaw	UK represented by Minister of the Armed Forces Luke Pollard.
3rd	12 March 2025	France	Defence Ministers	Sebastian Lecornu	Paris	Also attended by European Commissioner for Defence and Space Andrius Kubilius, Deputy Secretary General Charles Fries of the European External Action Service, and NATO deputy secretary general Radmila Šekerinska.
4th	16 May 2025	Italy	Defence Ministers	Guido Crosetto	Rome	
5th	10 September 2025	United Kingdom	Defence Ministers	John Healey	London	France represented by director general for international relations and strategy Alice Rufo, Germany by state secretary at the Federal Ministry of Defence Jens Plötner and Poland by Director of International Security Policy Marcin Kazmierski.
6th	14 November 2025	Germany	Defence Ministers	Boris Pistorius	Berlin	Also in attendance, European Commission vice-president Kaja Kallas. This meeting saw the announcement of the first joint E5 deployment, to Bosnia Hercegovina.
7th	20 February 2026	Poland	Defence Ministers	Władysław Kosiniak-Kamysz	Kraków	UK represented by Minister of Defence Readiness and Industry Luke Pollard. Also attended by the EU's Kaja Kallas, NATO's deputy secretary general Radmila Šekerinska and Ukrainian defence minister Mykhailo Fedorov.
8th	24 June 2026	Germany	Heads of Government	Friedrich Merz	Berlin	Announced at G7 June 2026 press conference.

== List of defence ministers ==
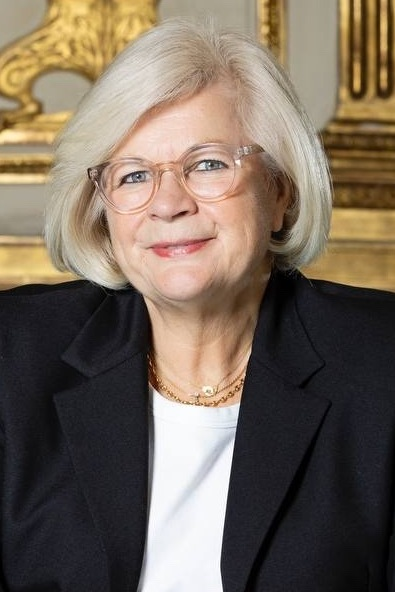
France
Catherine Vautrin,
Minister of the Armed Forces

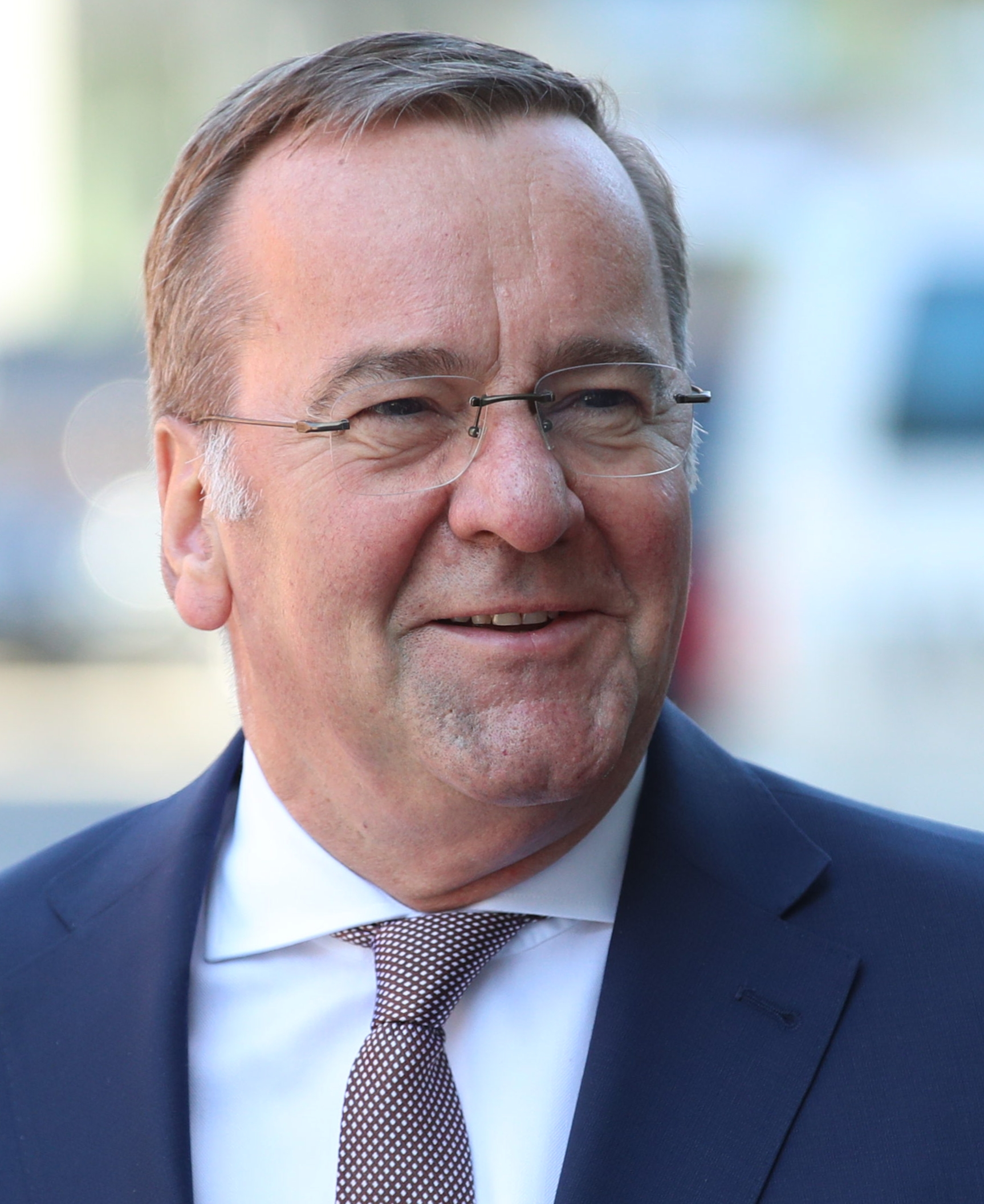
Germany
Boris Pistorius,
Federal Minister of Defence

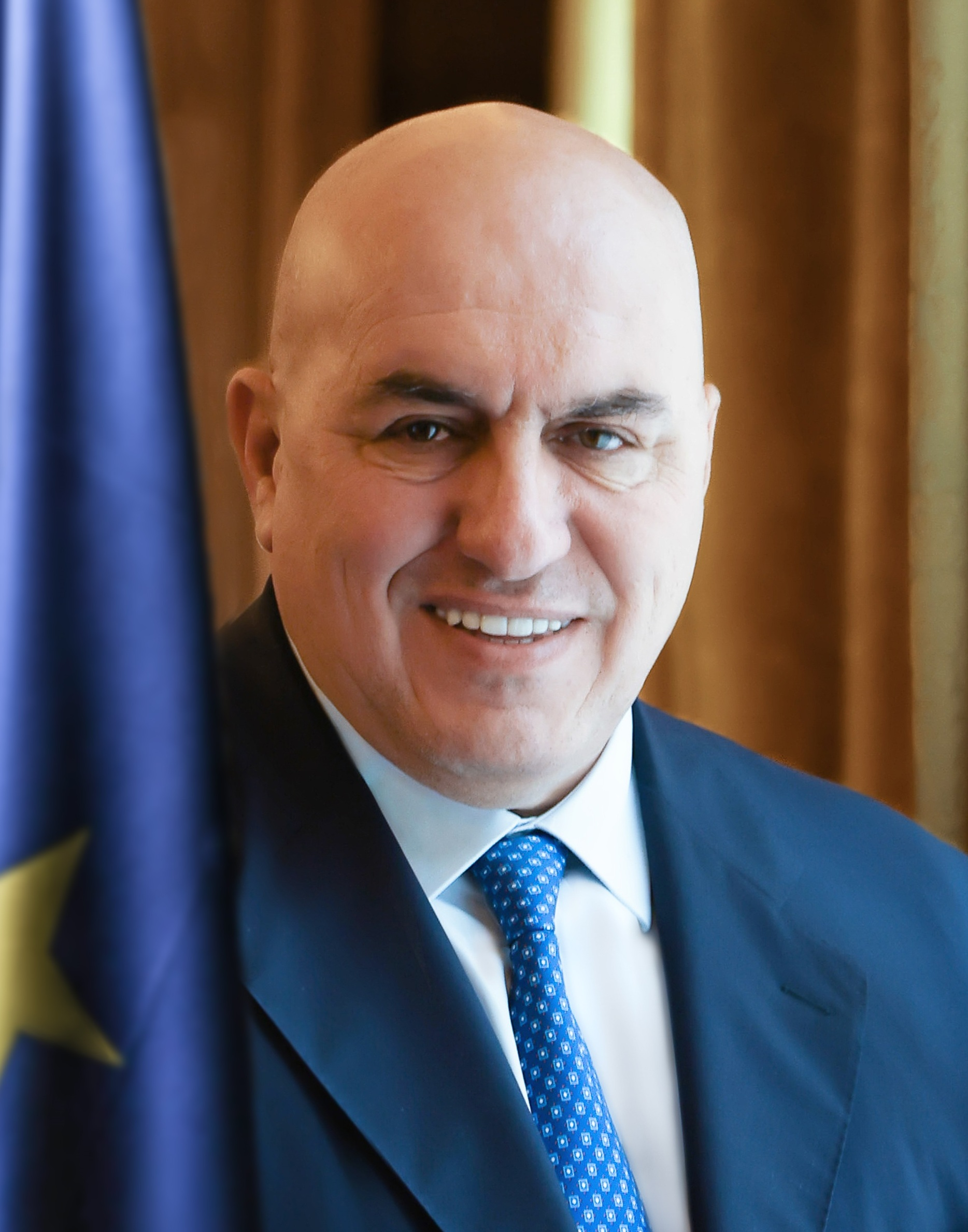
Italy
Guido Crosetto,
Minister of Defence

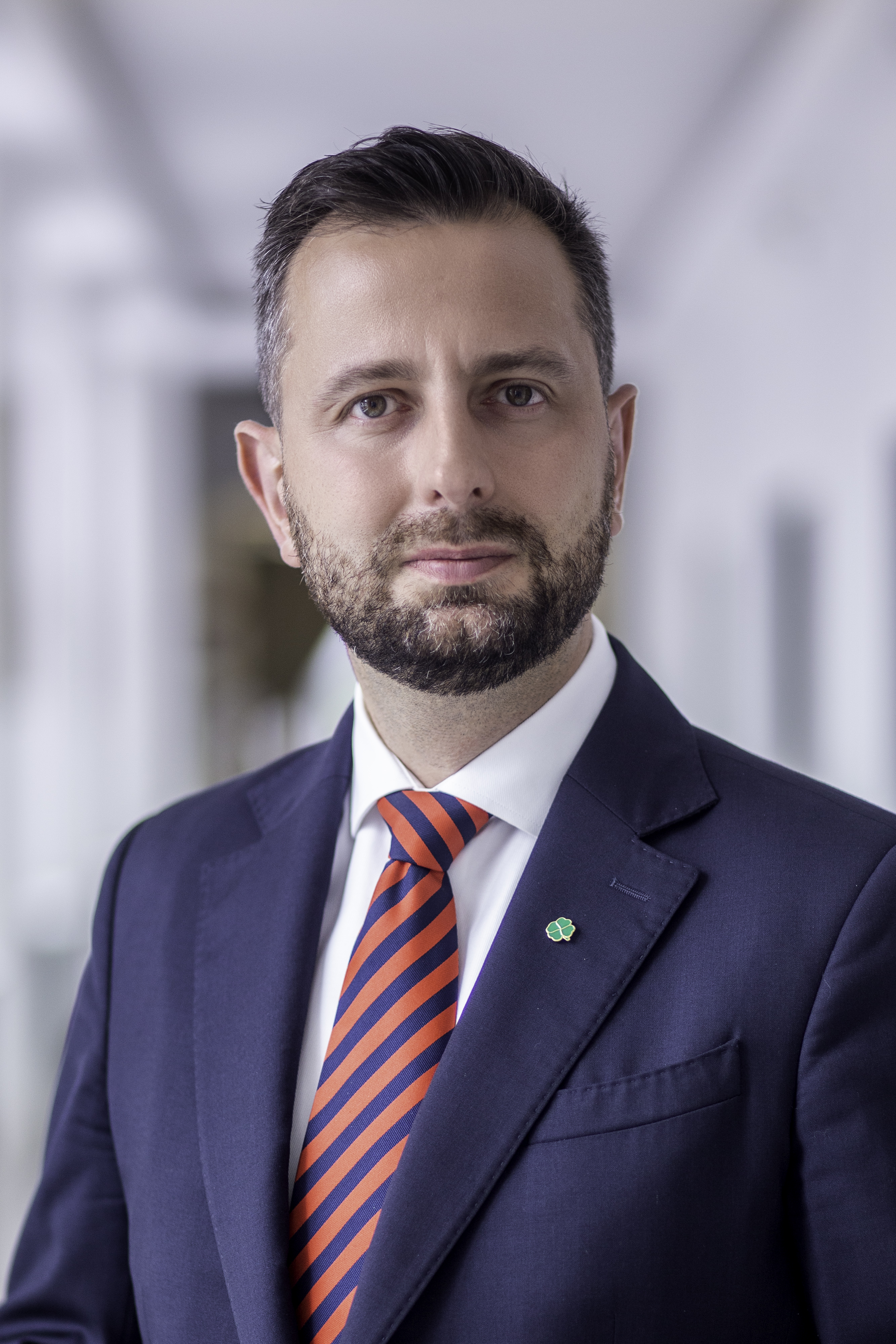
Poland
Władysław Kosiniak-Kamysz,
Minister of National Defence

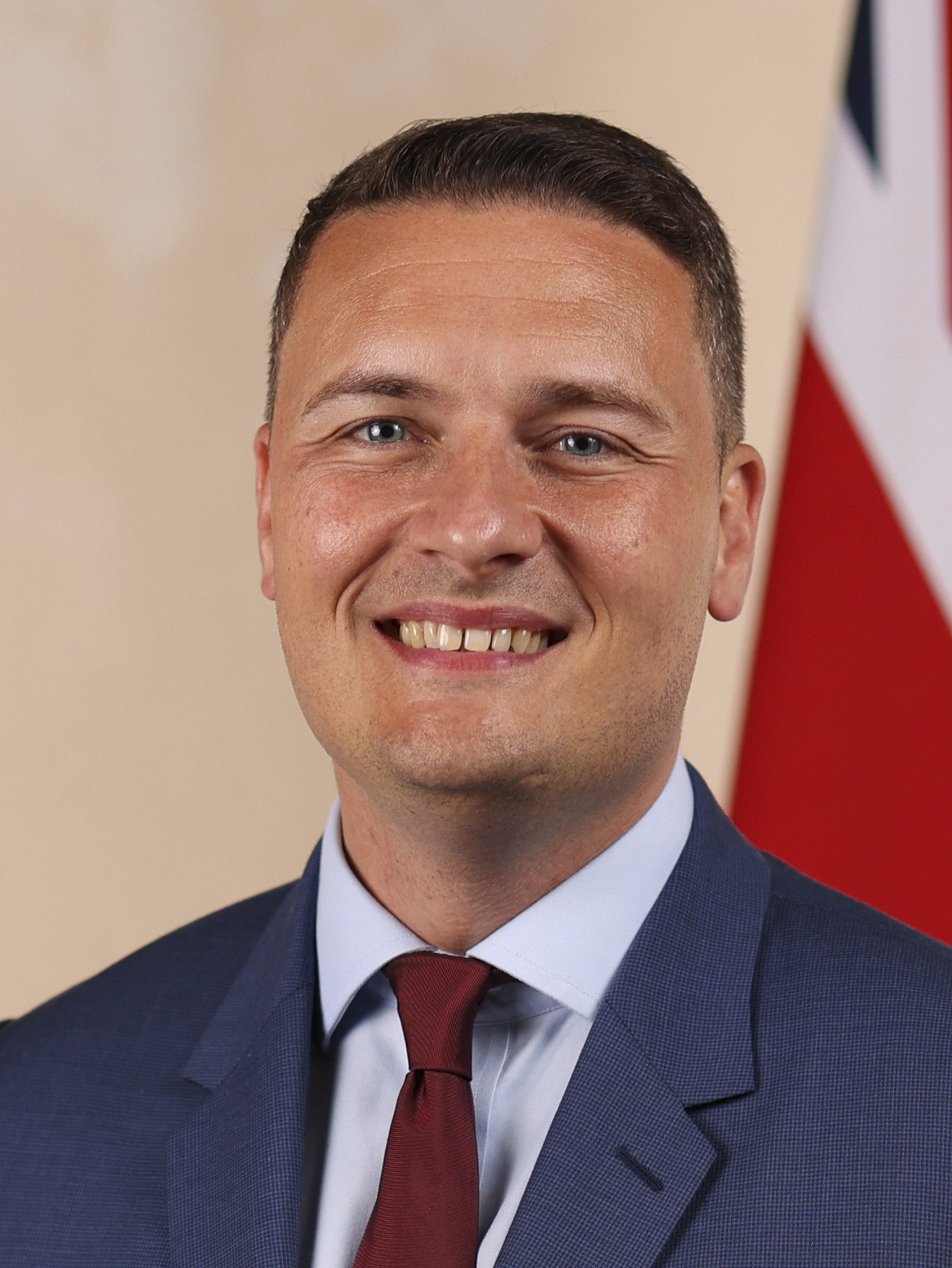
United Kingdom
Wes Streeting,
Secretary of State for Defence

== See also ==
2020s European rearmament
