= Big Four (Western Europe) =

Refers to France, Germany, Italy and the United Kingdom

- France; Germany; Italy; United Kingdom

The Big Four, also known as the E4 or G4, refers to France, Germany, Italy and the United Kingdom. France and the United Kingdom are official nuclear-weapon states and are permanent members of the United Nations Security Council. The United Kingdom is the only country of the Big Four which is not a member state of the European Union, having ended its membership in 2020, pursuant to a referendum held in 2016. France, Germany, Italy and the United Kingdom are considered major European powers and they are the Western European countries individually represented as full members of the G7 and the G20. They have been referred to as the "Big Four of Europe" since the interwar period.

The term G4 was used for the first time when French President Nicolas Sarkozy called for a meeting in Paris with Italian Prime Minister Silvio Berlusconi, British Prime Minister Gordon Brown and German Chancellor Angela Merkel to consider the response to the 2008 financial crisis and the Great Recession. The Organisation for Economic Co-operation and Development describes them as the "Four Big European Countries".

== Issues ==
The leaders of the four countries usually have a series of joint video conference calls with the US president (see NATO Quint), or with other leaders, on international issues. With US President Barack Obama, for example, they discussed the Transatlantic Trade and Investment Partnership, the Syrian civil war and the use of chemical weapons during the conflict, the Russian annexation of Crimea and international sanctions against Russia, the post-civil war violence in Libya, the Israeli–Palestinian conflict, the 2014 American intervention in Iraq and the Ebola virus disease. With Russian President Vladimir Putin, they discussed, for example, the Vienna peace talks for Syria.

== Statistics ==
Big Four
Country	Population	Share of EU population^{[A]}	Contribution to EU budget (2014-2020) (€ mil)		MEPs
France	66,616,416	14.97%	19,573.6	27.52%	79
Germany	80,716,000	18.54%	25,815.9	36.30%	96
Italy	60,782,668	13.58%	14,368.2	20.20%	76
United Kingdom	67,791,400	N/A	11,341.6	15.95%	N/A
Total	272,215,084	47.09%	71,099.3	64.24%	251

^{A} Council of EU voting, where procedure indicates a qualified majority vote, requires a double majority of at least 55% of EU member states and 65% of EU population to adopt Commission proposals. This increases to 72% of EU member states and 65% of EU population when the proposal originates from a member state.

== History ==
France, Germany, Italy and the United Kingdom have been referred to as the "Big Four of Europe" since the interwar period (1919–1939), when the four countries signed the Four-Power Pact and the Munich Agreement. Britain and France, permanent members of the League of Nations' executive council along with Italy and Japan, were involved in a policy of appeasement towards Germany. World War II (1939–1945) saw the United States, the United Kingdom, Russia, France and China fighting against Germany, Italy and Japan. The defeat of the Axis powers resulted in the formation of the United Nations, where the five victorious countries of the Allied powers were granted a permanent seat in the Security Council. Germany, Italy and Japan experienced a post-war economic miracle and took part in the 1st G6 summit along with France, the United Kingdom and the United States in 1975.

Since 1945, France and Great Britain have often acted alone in defence policy matters while Germany and Italy have preferred to act within the framework of international organisations. For example, France, Germany, Italy and the UK were the EU countries represented in the Syria peace talks, but only France and the UK are directly bombing ISIS in Syria, while Germany and Italy prefer to give military aid and to send training troops.

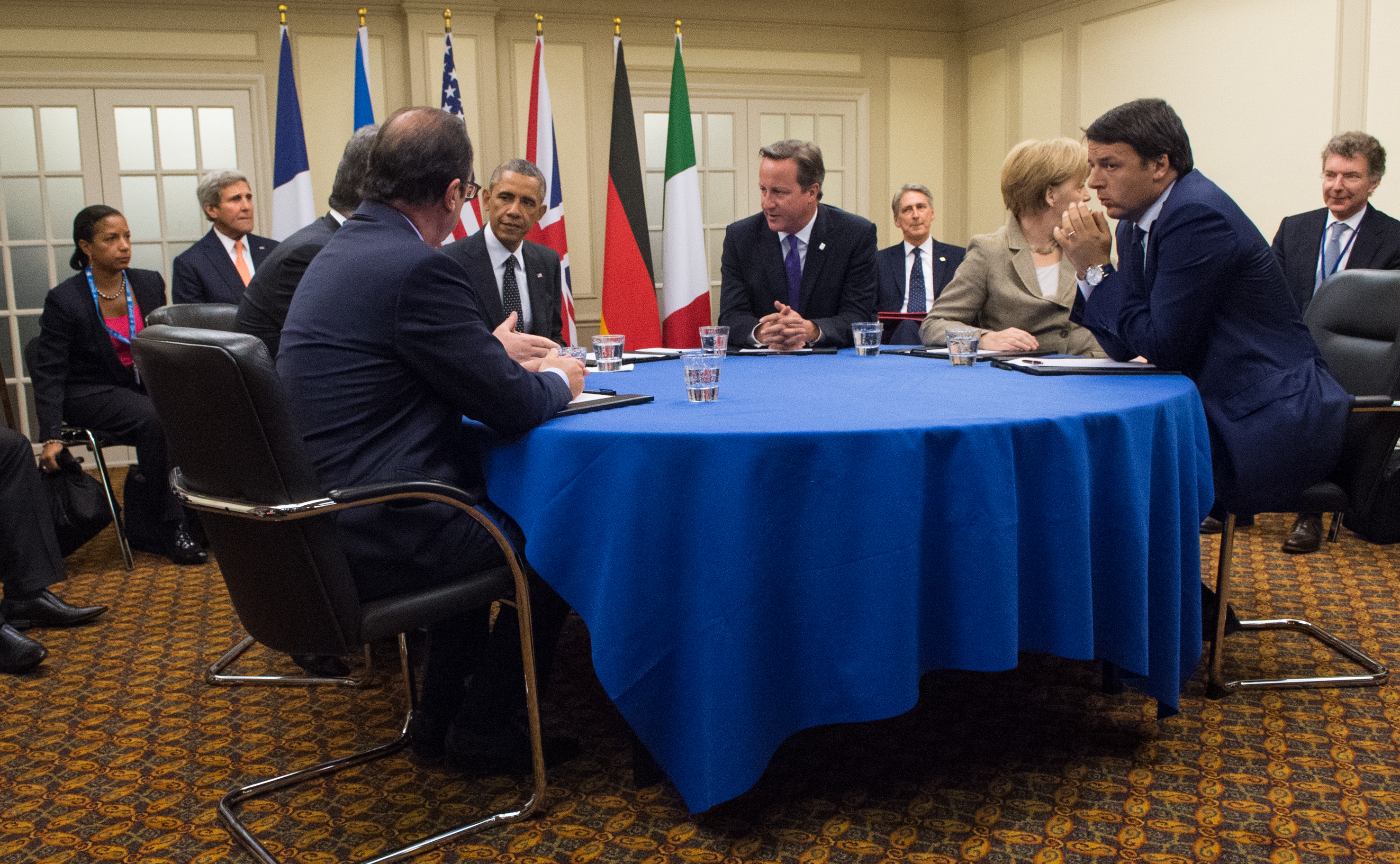
US President Barack Obama with EU4 leaders Hollande, Cameron, Merkel and Renzi during the 2014 Wales summit

=== Quint ===
The Quint (or NATO Quint) is an informal decision-making group consisting of five Western powers: the United States and the Big Four (France, Germany, Italy and the United Kingdom). It operates as a "directoire" of various entities such as NATO and the G7/G20.

=== Brexit ===
A European Union membership referendum took place on Thursday 23 June 2016 in the UK and resulted in an overall vote to leave the EU, by 51.9%. The British government triggered Article 50 of the Treaty on European Union to begin the process to leave the EU, which concluded on 31 January 2020. The G4 now consists of the UK and the new EU big three (Germany, France and Italy), the large founding members of the European Communities that have retaken a leading role in Europe following the decision of the UK to leave the EU.

== Current government leaders ==
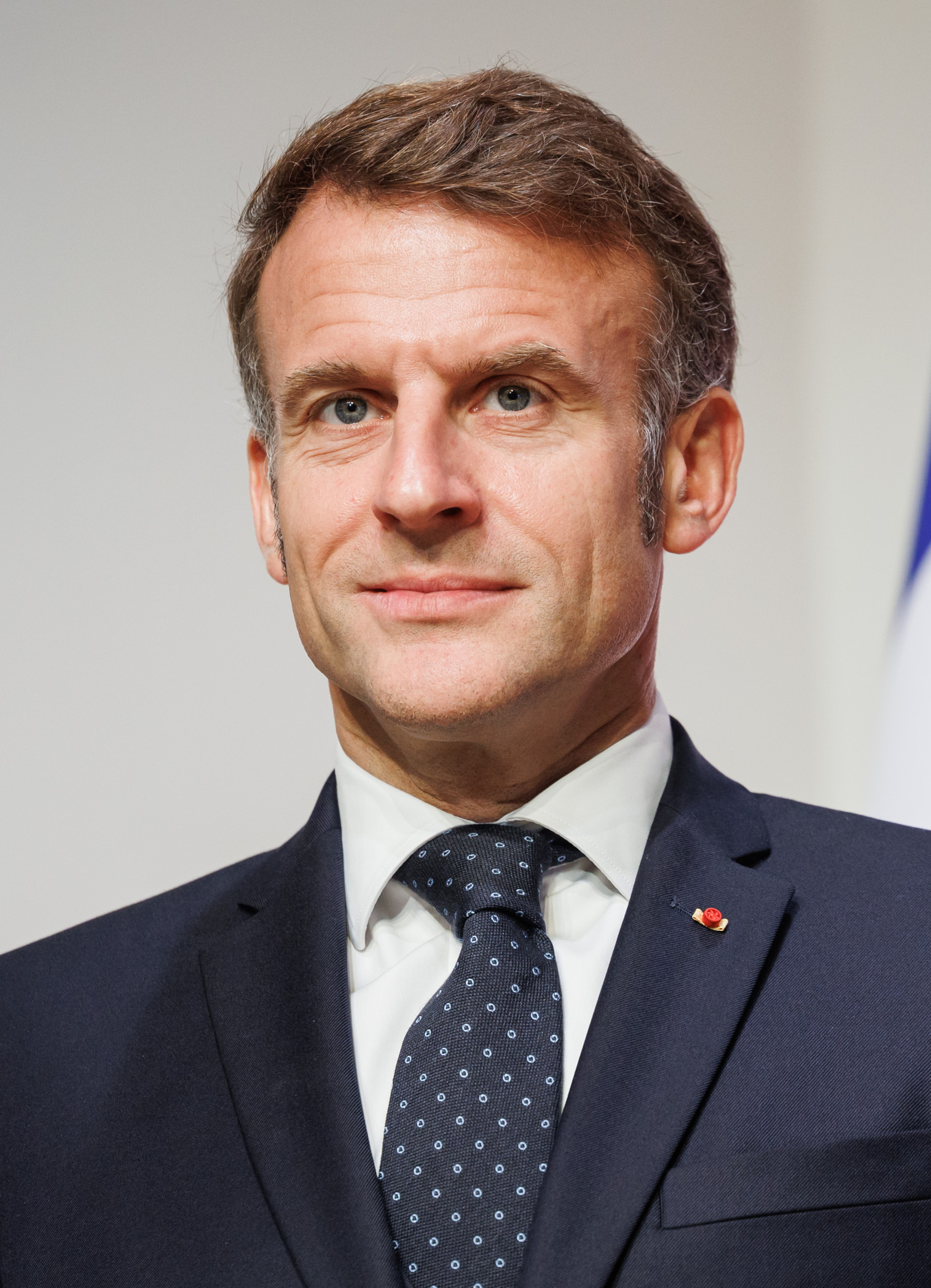
(France) France
Emmanuel Macron, President

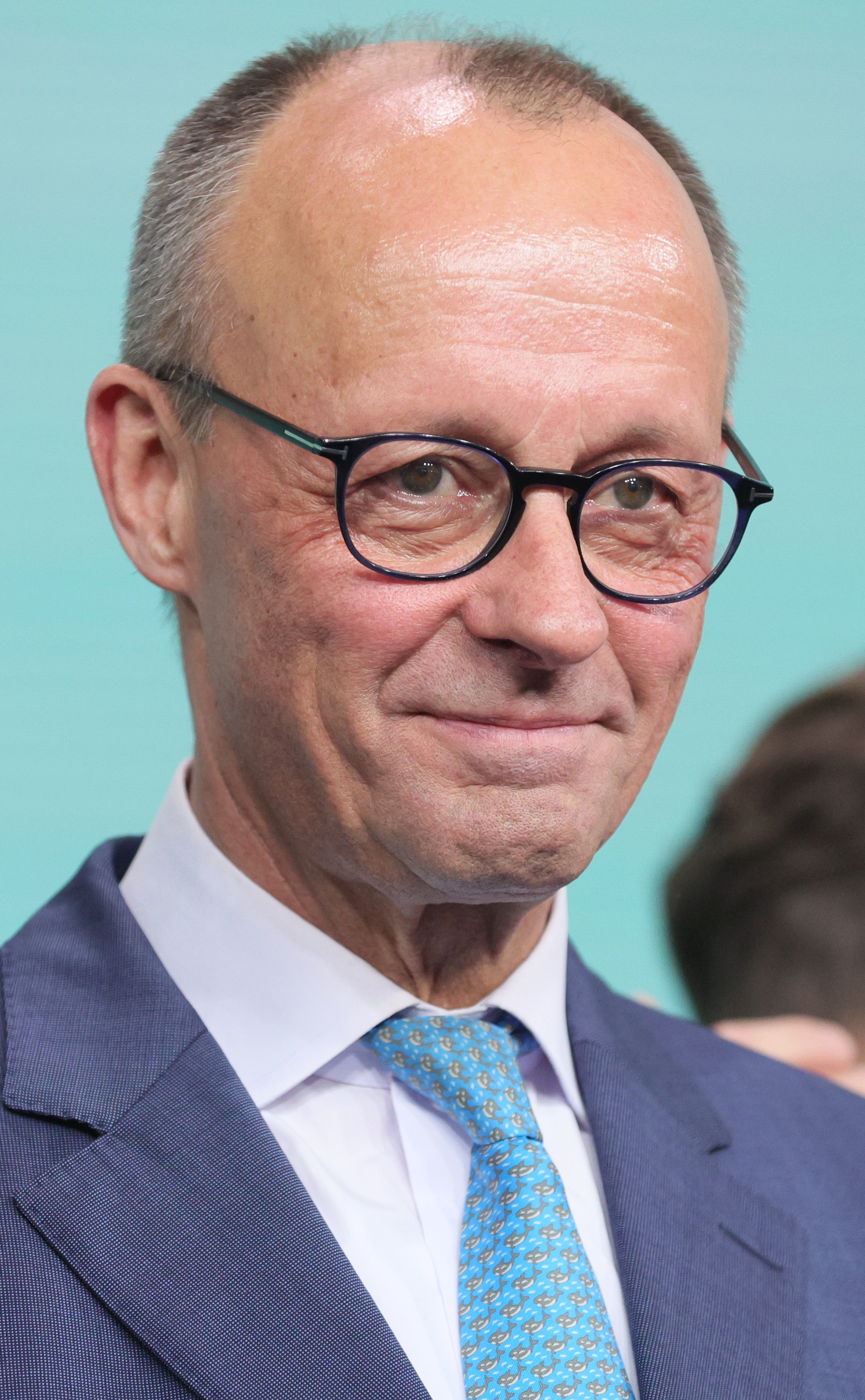
(Germany) Germany
Friedrich Merz, Chancellor

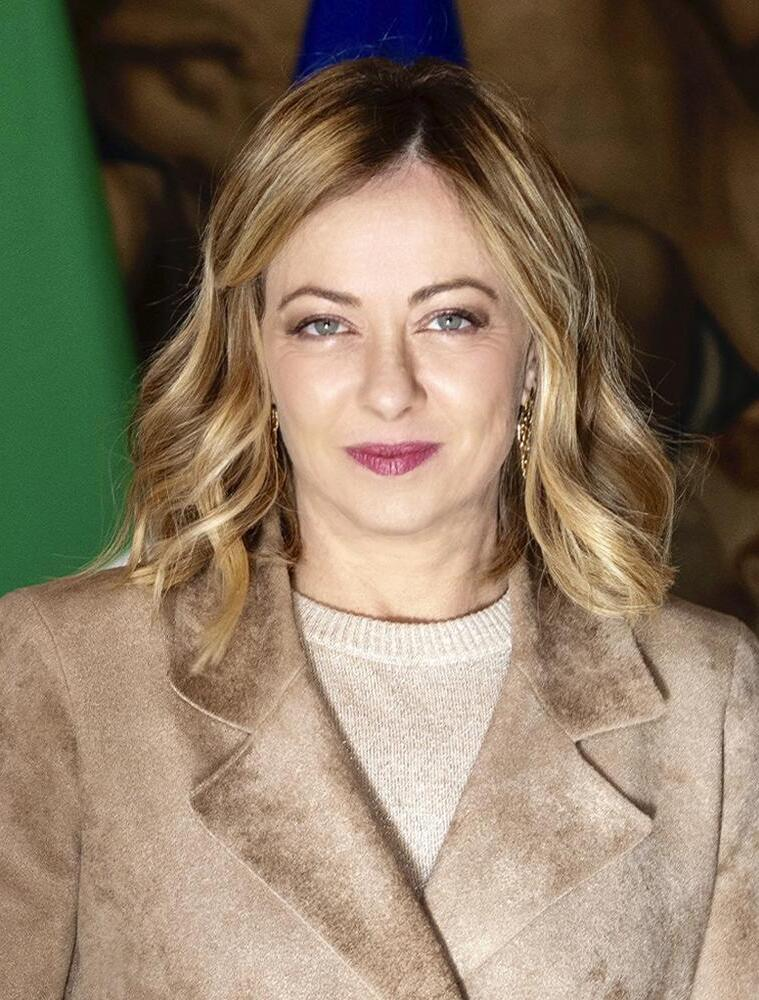
(Italy) Italy
Giorgia Meloni, Prime Minister

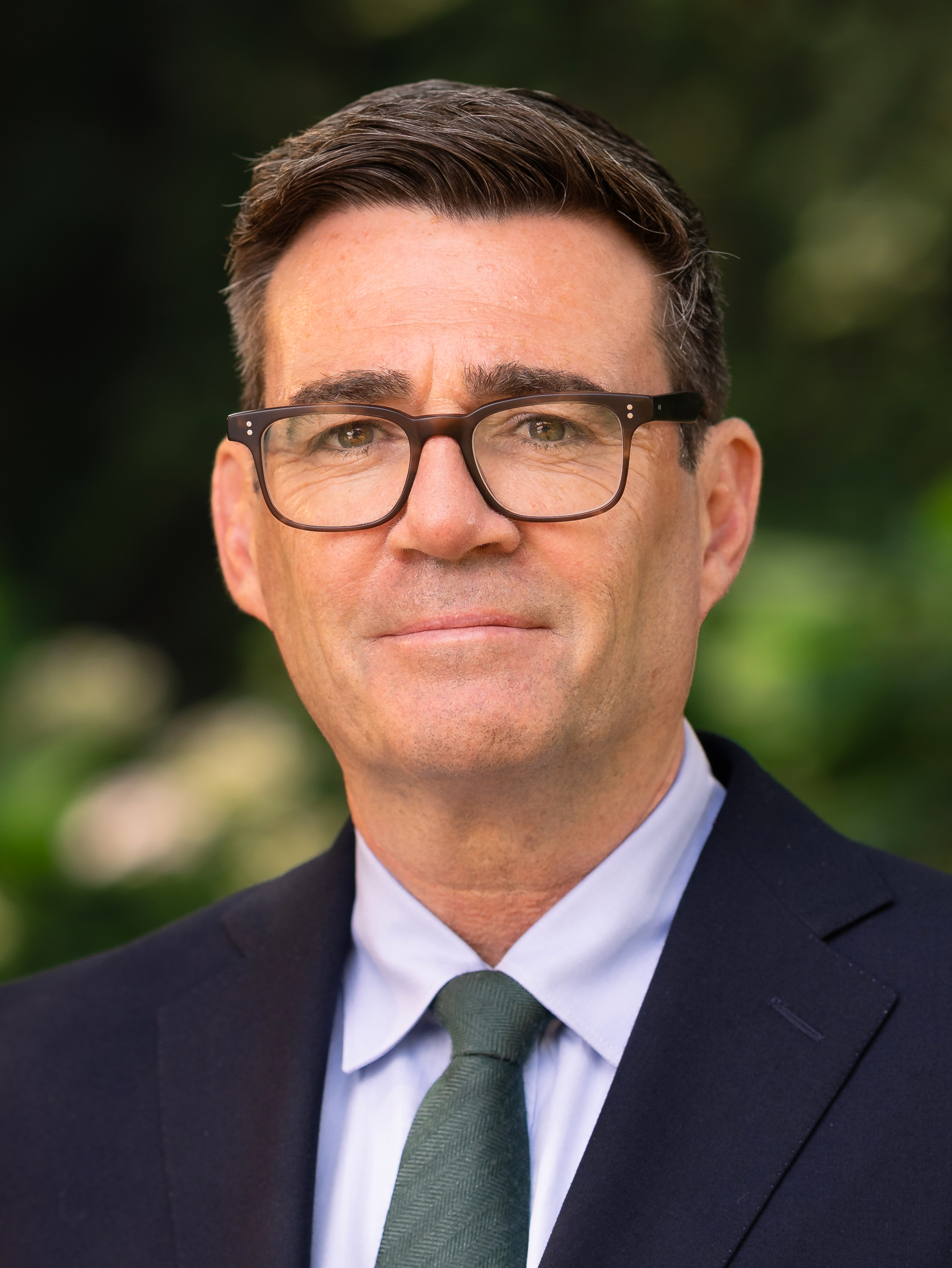
(United Kingdom) United Kingdom
Andy Burnham, Prime Minister

== See also ==
- Big Four (Eurovision)
- EU three
- European Group of Five
- E5 (European Group of Five)
- France–Italy relations
- France–Germany relations
- France–United Kingdom relations
- Germany–Italy relations
- Germany–United Kingdom relations
- Italy–United Kingdom relations
- Inner Six
- Great power
- G7
- Group of Nine
