= EU three =

France, Germany, and Italy as the major EU founding members

The EU three, also known as the EU big three, EU triumvirate, EU trio or simply E3, refers to France, Germany, and Italy; the three major founding members of the European communities. These countries are generally regarded as the three most politically and economically influential EU member states, with the largest populations, highest military expenditures, and largest economies by nominal GDP, collectively accounting for over half of the EU's economic output.

Before Brexit, the term was also used to refer to the grouping of France, Germany, and the United Kingdom, especially during the negotiations with Iran from 2003.

In a non-European Union context, the term E3 is commonly used to describe the three largest western European economies: France, Germany, and the United Kingdom.

== EU-3 (EU founding states) ==
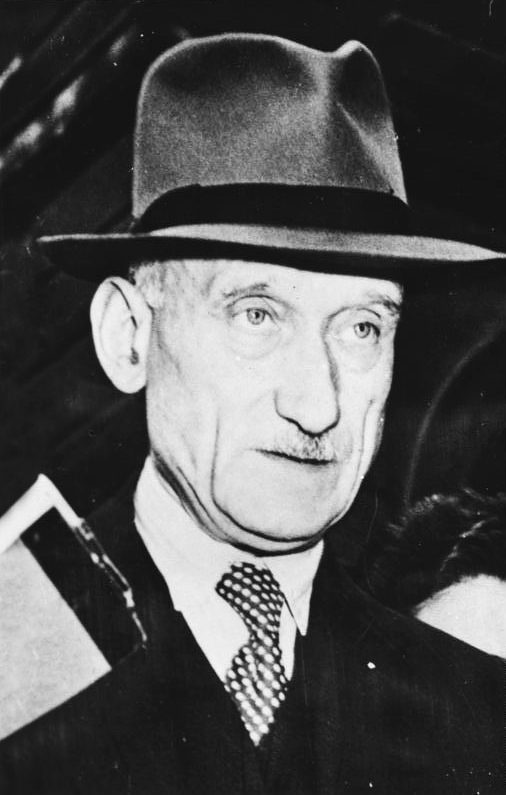
Robert Schuman, founding father and Prime minister of France (1947–1948)

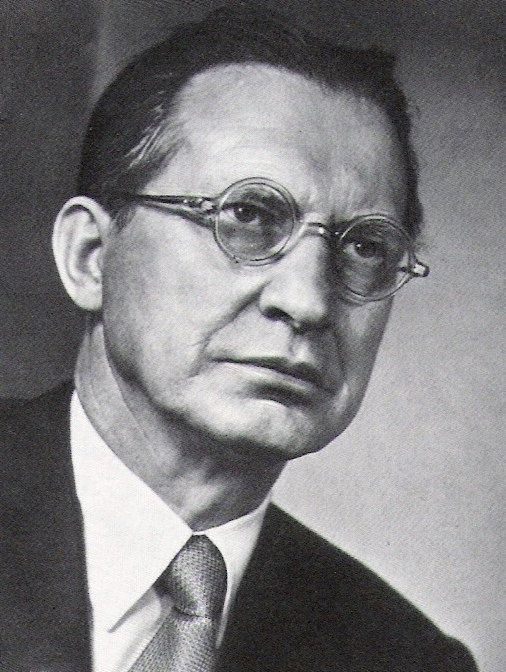
Alcide De Gasperi, founding father and Prime minister of Italy (1945–1953)

=== Activities ===
Germany, France and Italy were part of the original Inner Six founders of the EU along with Benelux nations.

=== Negotiations for greater integration in the EU ===
Determined to keep the European project intact in the wake of the UK's vote to leave the European Union in 2016, France, Germany and Italy called for greater integration in various trilateral summits in Berlin, Paris and Ventotene. More recently France, Germany and Italy have agreed a common position about the Paris climate agreement they have led a draft EU law to restrain Chinese acquisitions of European firms and technologies and they lead the EU sanctions on North Korea.

=== Statistics ===
EU big three
| Country | Population | Votes in the Council (pre-Brexit) | Contribution to EU budget | | MEPs | NATO Quint | G7/G8/G20 | P5 | G4 nations | Uniting for Consensus |
|---|---|---|---|---|---|---|---|---|---|---|
| France | 66,616,416 | 13.05% | 17,303,107,859€ | 16.44% | 74 | ✓ | ✓ | ✓ | ✗ | ✗ |
| Germany | 80,716,000 | 16.06% | 22,218,438,941€ | 21.11% | 96 | ✓ | ✓ | ✗ | ✓ | ✗ |
| Italy | 60,782,668 | 12.00% | 14,359,479,157€ | 13.64% | 73 | ✓ | ✓ | ✗ | ✗ | ✓ |

== E3 ==
During the period following the accession of the United Kingdom to the European Communities in 1973 and prior to Brexit in 2020, the terms EU3 or E3 were commonly used to describe the three largest economies of the European Union: France, Germany, and the United Kingdom. Since Brexit, the term "E3" is commonly used to describe the same countries, the three largest economies in western Europe, in a non-European Union context. The three countries often co-operate in the E3 format, especially on topics like the Iranian nuclear program, and have issued joint statements in relation to the 2026 Israeli–United States strikes on Iran. They remain the most active European supporters of Ukraine following the 2022 Russian invasion of Ukraine.

| Country | Trade bil. USD (2022) | Nom. GDP mil. USD (2025) | PPP GDP mil. USD (2025) | Nom. GDP per capita USD (2025) | PPP GDP per capita USD (2025) | HDI (2023) | Population (2022) | Area km^{2} | EU | P5 | G4 | G7 | G20 | OECD | DAC | title=Country possesses nuclear weapons | IMF economy classification |
|---|---|---|---|---|---|---|---|---|---|---|---|---|---|---|---|---|---|
| France | 1,435.8 | 3,361,557 | 4,533,633 | 48,982 | 66,061 | 0.920 | 68,305,148 | 640,679 | ✓ | ✓ | ✗ | ✓ | ✓ | ✓ | ✓ | ✓ | Advanced |
| Germany | 3,226.9 | 5,013,574 | 6,153,741 | 59,925 | 73,553 | 0.959 | 84,316,622 | 357,114 | ✓ | ✗ | ✓ | ✓ | ✓ | ✓ | ✓ | ✗ | Advanced |
| United Kingdom | 1,353.3 | 3,958,780 | 4,454,716 | 56,661 | 63,759 | 0.946 | 68,492,933 | 242,495 | ✗ | ✓ | ✗ | ✓ | ✓ | ✓ | ✓ | ✓ | Advanced |

=== Negotiations with Iran ===
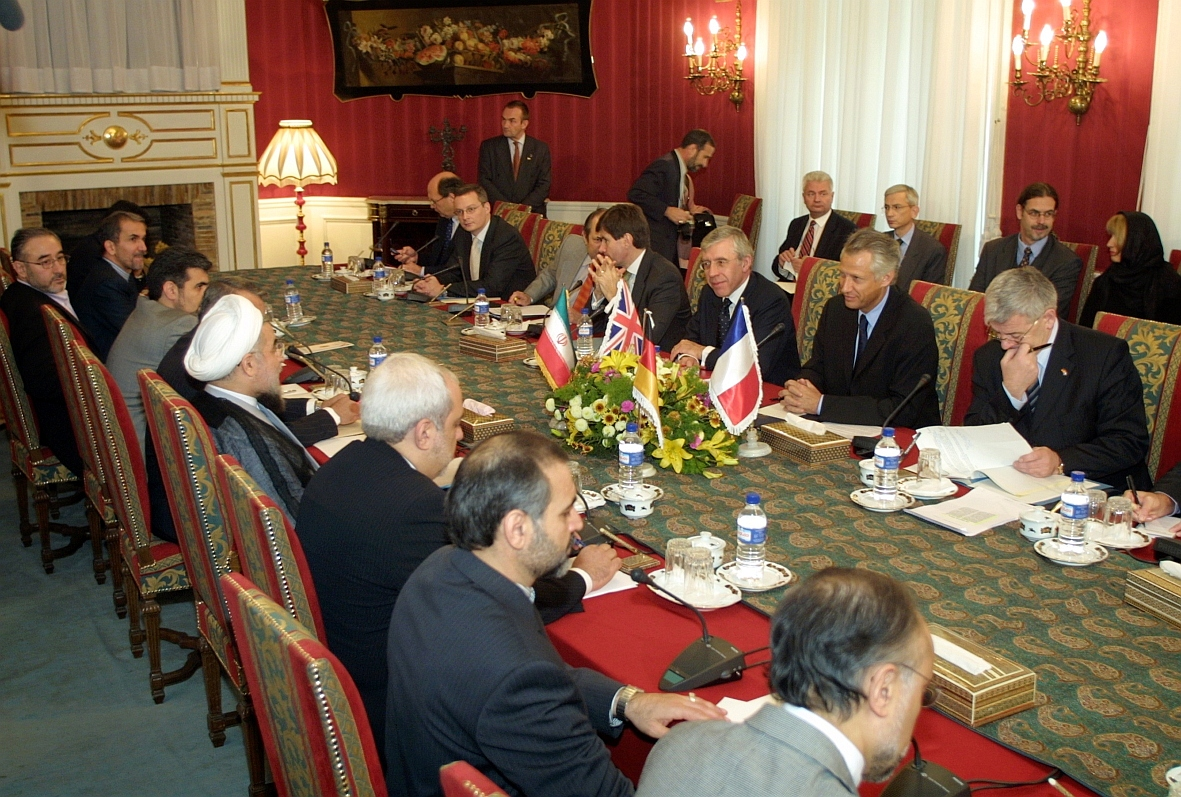
EU-3 ministers and Iran's top negotiator Hassan Rouhani, Sa'dabad Palace, Tehran, October 2003

In 2003, France, Germany and the UK launched negotiations attempting to limit the Iranian nuclear program, which led to the Tehran Declaration of 21 October 2003 and the voluntary Paris Agreement of 15 November 2004.

EU 3 + 3, more commonly referred to as the E3+3, refers to a grouping which includes the EU-3 and China, Russia, and the United States. It was coined when these states joined the EU diplomatic efforts with Iran in 2006. In the United States and Russia, it is more commonly known as P5+1, which refers to the five permanent members of the UN Security Council plus Germany.

Italy took part in a number of these meetings between 2006 and 2007. In 2014, under the request of the Italian PM Matteo Renzi, Foreign Minister Federica Mogherini was named High Representative of the EU as the negotiations approached a conclusion and came to an end with the elaboration of the Joint Comprehensive Plan of Action in 2015.

== See also ==
- Big Four (Western Europe)
- EU-15
- European balance of power
- Inner Six
- Iran–European Union relations
- Visegrád Group
