= Tao Bin =

Thai vending machine

TAO BIN
- A Tao Bin machine in Bangkok
- Native name: เต่าบิน
- Type: Subsidiary
- Industry: Automated retail; Food and beverage
- Founded: 2021; 5 years ago
- Founder: Watanya Amatanon
- Headquarters: 1053/1 Phaholyothin Road, Phayathai, Phayathai, Bangkok 10400, Thailand
- Number of locations: 7,499 (as of Q3 2025)
- Area served: 7 countries
- Products: Soft Drinks; Coffee; Tea; Smoothies; Protein shakes; Automated café services
- Owner: Forth Vending Company Limited
- Parent: Forth Corporation Public Company Limited
- Website: tao-bin.com

Tao Bin (Thai: เต่าบิน, RTGS: Tao Bin, pronounced [tàw bin]) is a robotic barista and smart vending machine that dispenses a range of customized hot and cold beverages. Developed by Forth Vending, the machine uses a touchscreen interface and robotic arms to prepare drinks, which includes coffee, smoothies, protein shakes, and soft drinks.

The machine was developed to meet demand for contactless services during the COVID-19 pandemic. Started in Thailand, from 2021, the number of operating machines increased from 64 to more than 7,500. Later, Tao Bin expanded internationally to other markets such as Malaysia, Singapore, Hong Kong, Australia, Dubai, and the UK.

== Features ==
Customers interact with the machine to browse the menu and select a beverage. A key feature of the system is the ability for users to customize their drinks. Once a selection is made, the machine prepares the drink, in about one minute.

=== Payment ===
Tao Bin machines support multiple payment methods. While specific options vary by region, they typically include cash (banknotes and coins), QR code payments through mobile banking apps, and credit/debit card payments.

== History ==
=== Development and launch (2019–2021) ===
The concept for Tao Bin was developed in reaction to the COVID-19 pandemic, which created demand for contactless services. The project was initiated by Forth Vending Company Limited, a subsidiary of Forth Corporation Public Company Limited, a Thai company known for its "Boonterm" top-up kiosks.The goal was to restore Forth's vending operations, which had been struggling to generate profit mainly because of the high maintenance costs of traditional imported machines.

The development was led by Watanya Amatanon, the daughter of Forth's founder, Pongchai Amatanon. Returning to Thailand from the United States during the pandemic, she brought her experience in technology and UX design to the project. The old vending machines were "not designed for the warm climate of Thailand, where ingredients could go bad very quickly..." which inspired the development of a new machine.

The brand name, Tao Bin, which translates to "flying turtle," was chosen to show the difference between the slow, traditional methods of drink preparation and the speed and efficiency of the new automated system.

The first machines were deployed in 2021. The machines gained traction due to their contactless nature and 24-hour availability. By the end of 2021, the company had deployed approximately 500 machines, primarily in hospitals, condominiums, and office buildings. Initially, there were 170 different beverages on the menu.

=== Domestic expansion (2022–2023) ===
Between 2022 and 2023, Tao Bin underwent a period of rapid expansion within Thailand. The number of operating machines grew from roughly 600 in early 2022 to nearly 5,000 by the end of the year. By mid-2023, following this expansion, the company reported daily sales volume exceeding 200,000 beverages.

The menu was expanded to 200 drinks. There were plans to open a "Tao Bin café" in the fourth quarter of 2023. These cafés were intended to offer a broader range of products, including milk tea, noodles, fried chicken, desserts, and soft-serve ice cream in a menu of over 300 different options.

In May 2023, Tao Bin expanded into international markets, beginning with Malaysia. There were also plans to enter other Southeast Asian markets, including Indonesia, the Philippines, Brunei, and the CLMV group, through partnerships with established beverage brands.

Tao Bin also began upgrading older models to hold more beverages to reduce maintenance. The most valuable drink sold was the "Oreo" -themed beverages, while Pepsi was the most commonly bought beverage split into multiple flavors such as melon or Yuzu.

=== Product diversification and global expansion (2025–present) ===
A Tao Bin vending machine in Hong Kong

The Tao Bin café included 2 more vending machines, Tao Tim, which dispenses soft-serve ice cream, and Tao Pang, which provides bread and other pastries.

In May 2025, it was reported that Tao Bin would produce a new range of smoothie vending machines called "Tao Pun." This includes a partnership with the Thai Ministry of Commerce to source 1,000 tonnes of fresh fruit directly from farmers, Tao Pun was planned to launch in major retail centers around June.

The company has also expanded its international presence to include Hong Kong, Singapore, Australia, Dubai, and England through joint ventures and partnerships.

== Technology and design ==
Tao Bin uses smart robotics, artificial intelligence (AI), internet of things (IoT), as well as machine learning. The machinery was built for Thailand's tropical climate, alongside a "mechanical legs" mechanism for dispensing and mixing materials. The system, built and developed by Thai engineers, houses over 7,000 mechanical parts and is covered by over 40 patents.

=== User interface and customization ===
The machine utilizes a touchscreen interface for ordering. Customers can choose from a large range of drink options. Users can also alter sweetness levels, toppings, and temperature.

=== Manufacturing and internal operation ===
The company uses 3D printing to build the machine cabinets and parts. The cups, lids, and straws are manufactured from recycled plastic. To ensure food safety, ice is made within the machine itself. Hygiene is controlled by using high-pressure boiling water, reverse osmosis, filtration, and UV sterilizers. The machine does not need external water pipelines, since water is refilled manually.

=== Data collection ===
Tao Bin gathers operation and maintenance data, so that the supplier can monitor the condition of every machine, applying predictive analytics to notify staff of probable faults. Consumer data—such as flavor preferences, sweetness changes, and peak purchasing times—is gathered to optimize menu options. Real-time inventory monitoring allows for an optimized replenishment schedule, making sure that refilling routes are computed based on ingredient levels, rather than through a fixed timetable.

== Gallery ==
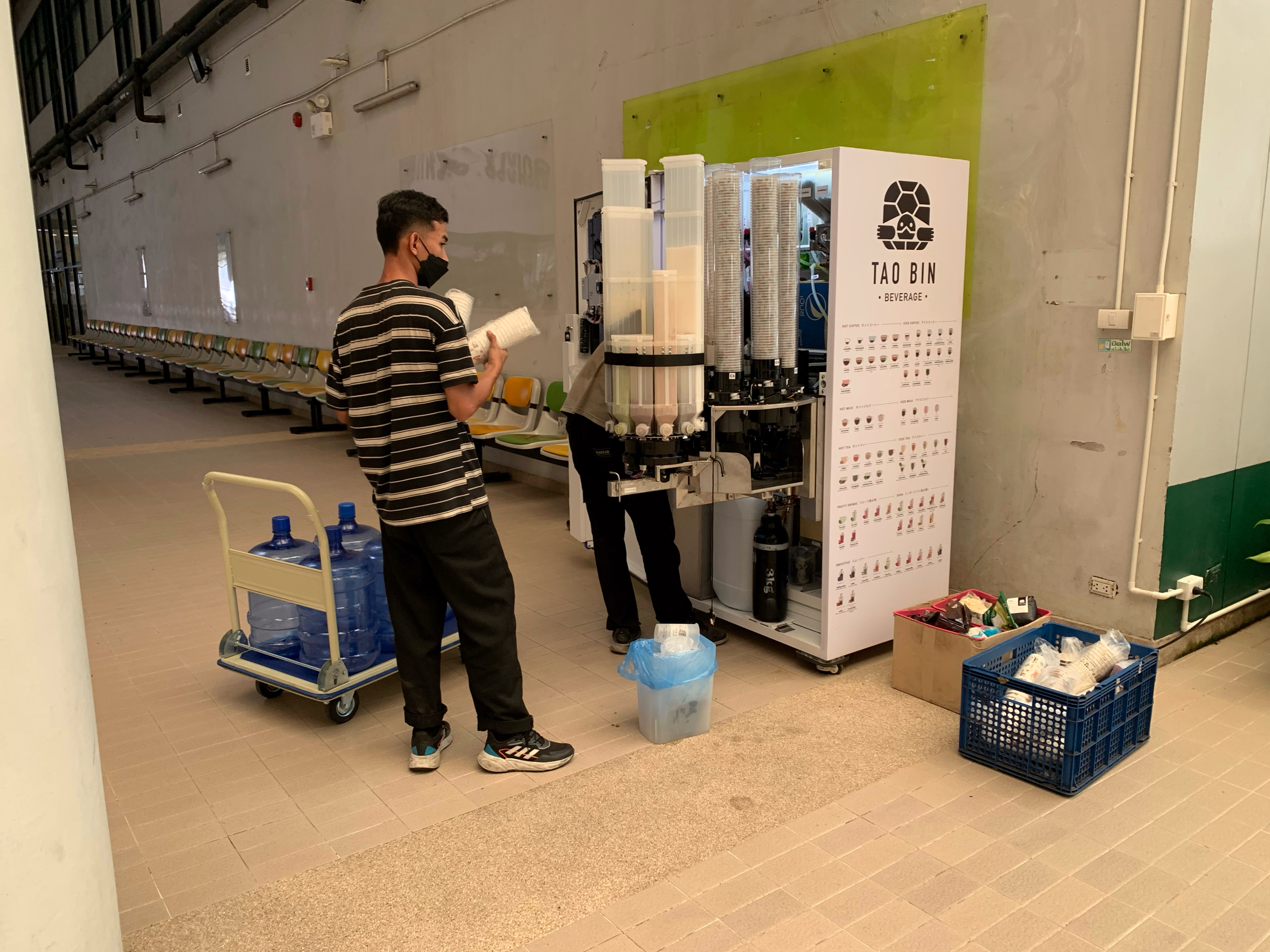
Restocking of a Tao Bin machine in Srinakharinwirot University, Ongkharak

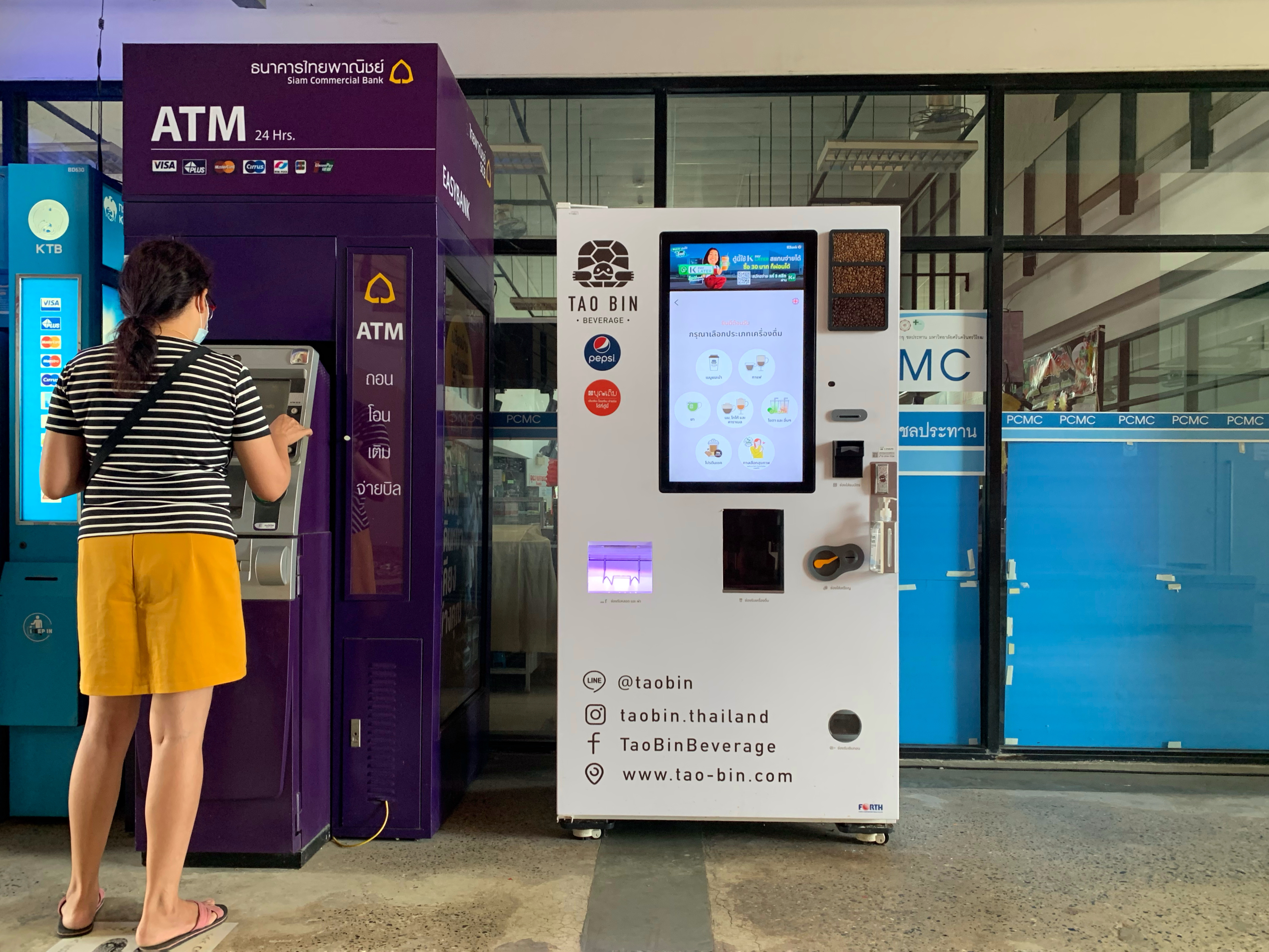
A Tao Bin machine alongside ATM machines in Panyananthaphikkhu Chonprathan Medical Center, Pak Kret

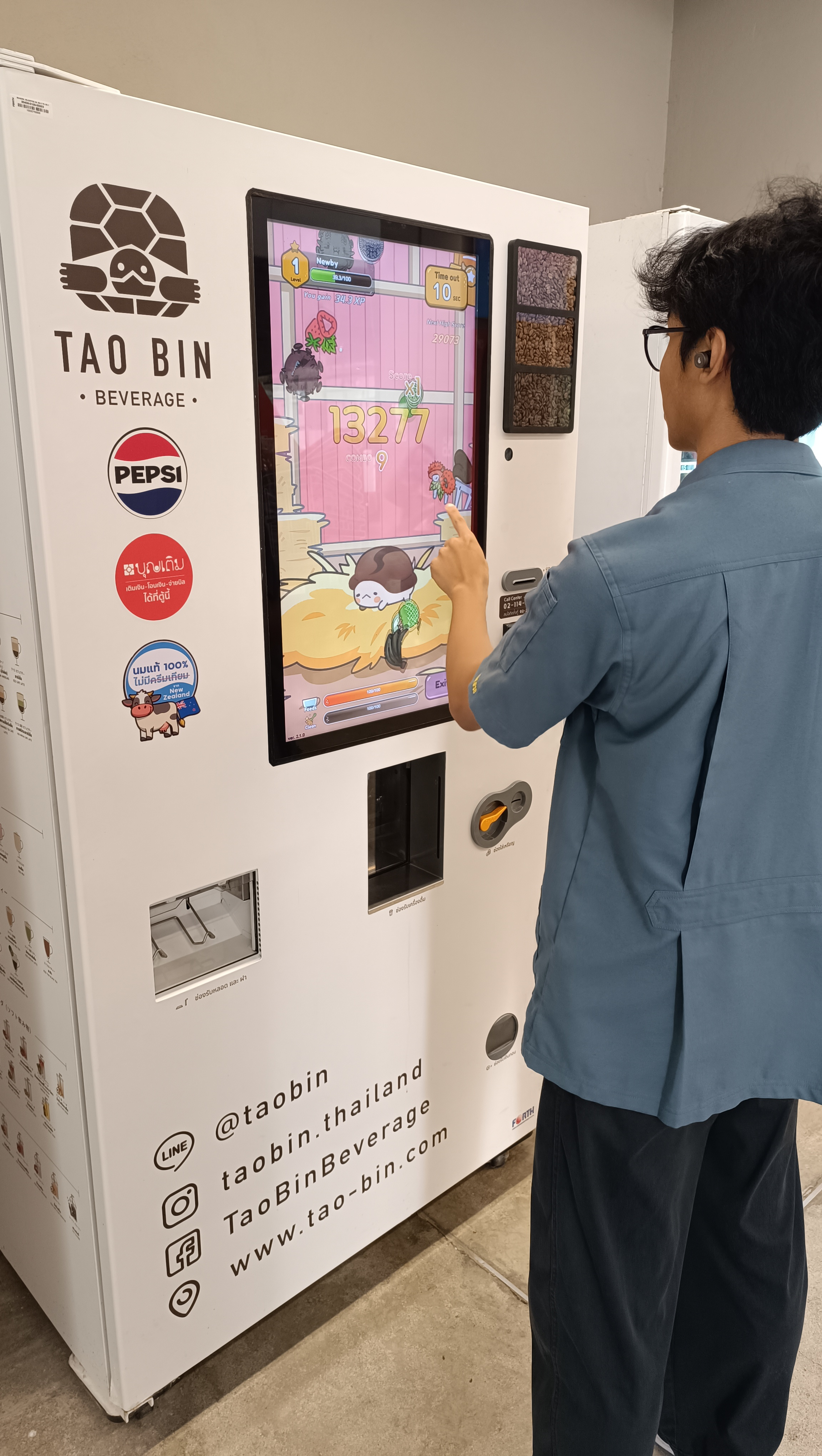
Tao Bin's mini-game at a machine in King Mongkut's University of Technology Thonburi, Bangkok

== See also ==
- Automated retail
- Food tech
- Self-service
- Vending machine
