= List of country groupings =

Groups of countries or regions are often referred to by a single term (word, phrase, or abbreviation). The origins of such terms include political alliances, intergovernmental organizations, business market areas, and mere colloquialism.

== A ==
- ABC nations: Argentina, Brazil, and Chile
- AfPak: Afghanistan and Pakistan
- African Union (AU): All 54 internationally recognized African nations and the disputed Sahrawi Arab Democratic Republic
- Bolivarian Alliance for the Peoples of Our America (ALBA): Socialist-leaning political and economic integration of Latin American and Caribbean nations
- Amazon Cooperation Treaty Organization (ACTO): Promotes sustainable development of the Amazon Basin
- AMEA: Asia, Middle East, and Africa
- America (AMER): Usage varies; it may refer to just the United States of America, or just North America, or all of North and South America, or some other combination.
- Americas (AMS or AMERS): Usage varies; often refers to all of North and South America.
- AMET: Africa, Middle East, and Turkey
- AMS: Andorra, Monaco, and San Marino
- Andean Community (CAN): Free trade area consisting of Bolivia, Colombia, Ecuador, and Peru
- ANZ: Australia and New Zealand
- ANZUK: Trilateral relations between Australia, New Zealand, and the United Kingdom
- APAC: Asia-Pacific (usage varies)
- Asia-Pacific Economic Cooperation (APEC): Forum of 21 nations in the Pacific Rim
- APJ: Asia-Pacific and Japan
- APMA: Asia-Pacific, Middle East, and Africa
- APSG: Asia-Pacific and Singapore
- Arab League: Regional organization of Arab nations
- Arab Maghreb Union (AMU; UMA): Regional organisation comprising five Arab and North African nations
- Arraiolos Group: Informal meeting of presidents of parliamentary and semi-presidential European Union member states
- Association of Southeast Asian Nations (ASEAN): Regional organisation comprising all 11 nations in Southeast Asia
- ASEAN+3: Including China, Japan, and South Korea. ASEAN+5: Including Japan, South Korea, India, Australia, and New Zealand. ASEAN+6: Including the previous 5 and China.
- Assembly of European Regions
- Association of Caribbean States
- AUKUS: Australia, the United Kingdom, and the United States
- Axis of evil (Historical): Iran, Ba'athist Iraq, and North Korea

== B ==
- Balkan states: Albania, Bosnia and Herzegovina, Croatia, Bulgaria, Greece, Kosovo, Montenegro, North Macedonia, Serbia, and Turkey; Romania and Slovenia are sometimes included.
- Baltics, three sovereign states in Northern Europe on the eastern coast of the Baltic Sea: Estonia, Latvia, and Lithuania.
- BASIC countries, four large newly industrialized countries, Brazil, South Africa, India, China, to act jointly on climate change and emissions reduction
- BBIN: Bangladesh, Bhutan, India and Nepal
- Benelux Union is a politico-economic union of three neighbouring states in western Europe: Belgium, the Netherlands, and Luxembourg.
- Big Four (Western Europe) refers to France, Germany, Italy and the United Kingdom. These countries are considered major European powers and they are the Western European countries individually represented as full members of the G7, the G8, the G-10 and the G20. This also has an impact on the Eurovision Song Contest, when these countries added to Spain, are turned the BIG 5.
- Big Five (association football): England, France, Germany, Italy, and Spain
- BIMSTEC, a group of countries in South Asia and South East Asia around the Bay of Bengal to promote technological and economic co-operation, which includes Bangladesh, Bhutan, India, Myanmar, Nepal, Sri Lanka, and Thailand.
- BRIC (economics term): Brazil, Russia, India, and China, which are all deemed to be at a similar stage of newly advanced economic development
- BRICS: Brazil, Russia, India, China, South Africa, Egypt, Ethiopia, Iran, Indonesia and the United Arab Emirates
- BSEC, the Organization of the Black Sea Economic Cooperation, is a regional organization focusing on multilateral political and economic initiatives aimed at fostering cooperation in the Black Sea region.
- Bucharest Nine: a group of nine Eastern-European NATO states including Bulgaria, the Czech Republic, Estonia, Hungary, Latvia, Lithuania, Poland, Romania and Slovakia

== C ==
- CAC: Central America and Caribbean
- CALA: Central America and Latin America, or the Caribbean and Latin America
- CAME: Central Asia and the Middle East
- CANZUK, the current personal union and proposed international organization composed of Canada, Australia, New Zealand, and the United Kingdom.
- CARICOM, Caribbean Community, an organization of fifteen Caribbean nations and dependencies
- CARIFTA: Caribbean Free Trade Association
- CEFTA, the Central European Free Trade Agreement, current members: Montenegro, Serbia, Albania, Bosnia-Herzegovina, Moldova and North Macedonia
- Celtic nations: Linguistic and cultural grouping consisting of countries and regions where the Celtic languages are spoken: Brittany, Cornwall, Ireland (including the Republic of Ireland and Northern Ireland), the Isle of Man, Scotland, and Wales.
- CEN-SAD: The Community of Sahel–Saharan States
- Central American Integration System
- CIVETS, six emerging markets countries: Colombia, Indonesia, Vietnam, Egypt, Turkey, and South Africa, a diverse and dynamic economy and a young, growing population
- CLMV, Cambodia, Laos, Myanmar and Vietnam in south east Asia, members of ASEAN
- Comecon, formally the Council of Mutual Economic Assistance, consisted of socialist economies within the Communist world: the Soviet Union, Bulgaria, Cuba, Czechoslovakia, East Germany, Hungary, Mongolia, Poland, Romania, and Vietnam. The organization existed from 1949 to 1991 during the Cold War.
- COMESA, the Common Market for Eastern and Southern Africa.
- Community for Democracy and Rights of Nations, a group of disputed states forging closer political ties. Members include Abkhazia, South Ossetia, and Transnistria.
- Commonwealth of Independent States (CIS), political alliance between the former Soviet Republics of Russia, Armenia, Azerbaijan, Belarus, Moldova (suspended participation), Kazakhstan, Kyrgyzstan, Tajikistan, Turkmenistan (associate member), Uzbekistan.
- Commonwealth of Nations, fifty-six member states that are mostly Dominions or former territories of the British Empire.
- Community of Latin American and Caribbean States (CELAC): regional bloc of Latin American and Caribbean states
- Community of Portuguese Language Countries, nine member states that are mostly Republics or former territories of the Portuguese Empire.
- Collective Security Treaty Organization, a military alliance between Russia, Armenia, Belarus, Kazakhstan, Kyrgyzstan, Tajikistan and observer members Serbia and Afghanistan.
- Council of Europe, political alliance of 46 European countries.
- CEE: Central and Eastern Europe
- CUSA: Canada and the United States
- Craiova Group: cooperation project of four European states – Romania, Bulgaria, Greece and Serbia – for the purposes of furthering their European integration as well as economic, transport and energy cooperation with one another.
- CRINK: China, Russia, Iran and North Korea

== D ==
- Developed countries
- Developing countries
- Development Assistance Committee (DAC), to discuss issues surrounding aid, development and poverty reduction in developing countries, the world's major donor countries, Australia, European Union, Iceland, New Zealand, South Korea, Austria, Finland, Ireland, Norway, Spain, Belgium, France, Italy, Poland, Sweden, Canada, Germany, Japan, Portugal, Switzerland, Czech Republic, Greece, Luxembourg, Slovakia, United Kingdom, Denmark, Hungary, Netherlands, Slovenia, and United States.
- DACH: Majority German-speaking states of Central Europe (excludes the Principality of Liechtenstein). Utilises the German name of Germany and the Latin names of Austria and Switzerland. Germany (Deutschland), Austria (Austria) and Switzerland (Confoederatio Helvetica), with Dach meaning "roof" in German. The term is sometimes extended to D-A-CH-Li, DACHL, or DACH+ to include Liechtenstein. Another version is DACHS (with Dachs meaning "badger" in German) with the inclusion of the German-speaking region of South Tyrol in Italy.
- D-8 Organization for Economic Cooperation (D8): An organization aimed to facilitate cooperation among the largely Muslim countries: Azerbaijan (the last addition in 2025, making them 9 member states), Bangladesh, Egypt, Indonesia, Iran, Malaysia, Nigeria, Pakistan and Turkey.
- D-10 Strategy Forum: ten "leading democracies", Australia, Canada, France, Germany, India, Italy, Japan, South Korea, United Kingdom and United States

== E ==
- East African Community (EAC) is an intergovernmental organisation composed of eight countries in the African Great Lakes region in eastern Africa: Burundi, Kenya, Rwanda, Somalia, South Sudan, Tanzania, Uganda and the DRC.
- ECCAS: The Economic Community of Central African States.
- ECGLC: The Economic Community of the Great Lakes Countries, consisting of Burundi, the Democratic Republic of the Congo, and Rwanda
- ECOWAS: The Economic Community of West African States, a regional political and economic union of fifteen countries located in West Africa.
- Eastern Partnership, a group of former soviet republics forging closer economic and political ties with the European Union. Members include Armenia, Azerbaijan, Belarus, Georgia, Moldova, and Ukraine.
- Economic Cooperation Organization (ECO), Afghanistan, Azerbaijan, Iran, Kazakhstan, Kyrgyzstan, Pakistan, Tajikistan, Turkey, Turkmenistan, Uzbekistan, a political and economic organization, a platform to discuss ways to improve development and promote trade and investment opportunities, the objective is to establish a single market for goods and services.
- EEA: The European Economic Area, which contains the European Union countries, plus Norway, Iceland and Liechtenstein
- EAEU: Eurasian Economic Union, an economic union of Belarus, Kazakhstan, Russia, Armenia, Kyrgyzstan and observer members Iran, Moldova, Uzbekistan and Cuba.
- Eight-Nation Alliance: military coalition that invaded northern China in 1900 during the Boxer Rebellion
- Eurabia: Islamophobic conspiracy theory that posits that globalist entities, led by French and Arab powers, aim to Islamize and Arabize Europe.
- EU, The European Union, a political and economic union of 27 member states that are located primarily in Europe.
- EU+EEA+CH: The European Union + the European Economic Area + Switzerland, sign visible very often shown on the Schengen Area airports
- Euronest Parliamentary Assembly: Interparliamentary forum between the EU and Eastern Partnership member states.
- EFTA: European Free Trade Association
- EMEA: Europe, the Middle East and Africa
- EMEAI: Europe, the Middle East, Africa and India
- EPC: Political forum of 47 European countries.

== F ==
- Five Eyes (FVEY), is an anglophone intelligence alliance comprising Australia, Canada, New Zealand, the United Kingdom and the United States.
- Federation of Euro-Asian Stock Exchanges (FEAS): Cooperation of stock-exchanges from Eastern Europe and West Asia.
- Four Asian Tigers: also called "Four Asian Dragons" or "Four Little Dragons", are the economies of Hong Kong, Singapore, South Korea, Taiwan, underwent rapid industrialization and maintained exceptionally high growth rates, now developed into advanced and high-income economies.
- Four Policemen: United Kingdom, Soviet Union, United States and Republic of China
- FLAME: France-Latin America relationship
- Francamérique: French Overseas region and collectivities in the Americas
- FRES: France and Spain (in Spanish as España)
- FRIT: France and Italy
- FRITES: France, Italy and Spain (in Spanish as España)
- FRITESPOR: France, Italy, Spain and Portugal (in Spanish as España)

== G ==
- Global North and Global South
- Group of Two (G2): hypothetical and informal grouping between the United States and China, representing the countries with the two largest economies in the world
- Global Governance Group (G3), a group of 30 small to medium member countries which collectively provides representation and input to the G20.
- G3 Free Trade Agreement: free trade agreement between Colombia, Mexico, and Venezuela
- 3G countries: 11 countries which have been identified as sources of growth potential
- G4 nations: Brazil, Germany, India, and Japan, four countries which support each other's bids for permanent seats on the United Nations Security Council.
- Group of Five: Brazil, China, India, Mexico and South Africa
- G5 Sahel: Burkina Faso, Chad, Mali, Mauritania and Niger
- EU's G6 - France, Germany, Italy, Poland, Spain, and the United Kingdom - countries with largest populations and thus the majority of votes in the Council of the European Union
- Group of Seven (G7): Canada, France, Germany, Italy, Japan, the United Kingdom, the United States, the seven major advanced economies as reported by the International Monetary Fund.
- Group of Seven Plus (g7+): 20 countries
- G8: US, UK, France, Germany, Italy, Canada, Russia, and Japan, the eight major advanced economies as reported by the IMF, which became the G7 after expelling Russia following the 2014 invasion of Crimea.
- G8+5, the G8 nations, plus the five leading emerging economies (Brazil, China, India, Mexico, and South Africa).
- Group of Nine: alliance of European states 1965-1971
- Group of Ten (IMF) (G10): 11 countries that agreed to participate in the General Arrangements to Borrow (GAB)
- Group of Twelve: G10, Australia and Spain
- Group of 15: developing countries from Latin America, Africa, and Asia
- G20, or Group of Twenty, twenty major economies comprising Argentina, Australia, Brazil, Canada, China, European Union, France, Germany, India, Indonesia, Italy, Japan, South Korea, Mexico, Russia, Saudi Arabia, South Africa, Turkey, United Kingdom, United States, for studying, reviewing, and promoting high-level discussion of policy issues pertaining to the promotion of international financial stability.
- Group of 22: G8 + 14 other countries
- Group of 24: a chapter of Group of 77
- Group of 77 (G77), a loose coalition of developing nations designed to promote its members' collective economic interests and create an enhanced joint negotiating capacity in the United Nations.
- GUAM Organization for Democracy and Economic Development: Georgia, Ukraine, Azerbaijan, and Moldova
- GCC (Gulf Cooperation Council): Bahrain, Kuwait, Oman, Qatar, Saudi Arabia, and the UAE. A regional intergovernmental political and economic union consisting of all Arab states of the Persian Gulf, except for Iraq.
- Greater China: Mainland China, Hong Kong, Macau, and Taiwan
- GSA/GAS: Germany, Austria, and Switzerland (uncommon, DACH is more widely used)

== I ==
- IBSA Dialogue Forum: India, Brazil, South Africa, an international tripartite grouping for promoting international cooperation among these countries.
- IGAD: the Intergovernmental Authority on Development, a trade bloc centered on the Horn of Africa, Nile Valley and African Great Lakes regions.
- IMEA: India, Middle East and Africa
- Inner Six - founding member states of the European Communities.
- International Solar Alliance, the International Solar Alliance (ISA), is an alliance of more than 122 countries initiated by India and France; most of them being sunshine countries, which lie either completely or partly between the Tropic of Cancer and the Tropic of Capricorn.
- Interparliamentary Assembly on Orthodoxy, an inter-parliamentary institution of 21 national parliaments representing Orthodox Christians.
- Indian Ocean Commission (IOC), intergovernmental organisation linking several African Indian Ocean nations
- I2U2 Group also known as West Quad is a grouping of India, Israel, the United Arab Emirates, and the United States who aim to cooperate on "joint investments and new initiatives in water, energy, transportation, space, health, and food security."

== J ==
- Jakarta–Peking Axis: strategic convergence between Indonesia, North Korea, North Vietnam, Mongolia, and China during the Cold War

== L ==
- La Francophonie: 56 member states, that were once former territories and colonies of the French colonial empire. Representing more than 1 billion people (12% of the world population) and spanning over 28 million km2 or 27% of the world's land area.
- LAC: Latin America and the Caribbean
- LAMEA: Latin America, the Middle East and Africa
- LATAM: Latin America
- LATCAR: Latin America and the Caribbean
- Levant: Cyprus, Israel, Jordan, Lebanon, Palestine, Syria
- Lublin Triangle: Poland, Lithuania, Ukraine (Union of Lublin created the Polish–Lithuanian Commonwealth)
- Lusofonia: an international organization representing countries and regions where Portuguese is a lingua franca or customary language

== M ==
- Maphilindo: proposed loose political association of Malaya, Philippines and Indonesia
- Mercosur (Southern Common Market), a trade bloc of Argentina, Bolivia, Brazil, Paraguay, Uruguay, to promote free trade and the fluid movement of goods, people, and currency.
- MIKTA, an informal partnership between Mexico, Indonesia, Republic of Korea (South Korea), Turkey, Australia, to support effective global governance.
- MINT, the economies of Mexico, Indonesia, Nigeria, and Turkey.
- MART: Middle East, Africa, Russia and Turkey
- MEA: Middle East and Africa
- MEASEA : Middle East, Africa and South East Asia
- MEESA: Middle East, Eastern and Southern Africa
- MEISA: Middle East, Indian Subcontinent and Africa
- MENA: Middle East and North Africa
- MENACA: Middle East, North Africa, and Central Asia
- MENAPT: Middle East, North Africa, Pakistan, and Turkey.
- MEP: Middle East and Pakistan
- MRU: the Mano River Union, consisting of Côte d'Ivoire, Guinea, Liberia and Sierra Leone
- MSG: Melanesian Spearhead Group; Fiji, Papua New Guinea, the Solomon Islands, Vanuatu, and the Kanak and Socialist National Liberation Front of New Caledonia

== N ==
- NAC: North America and the Caribbean
- NAM: Non-Aligned Movement
- NATO: North Atlantic Treaty Organization; NATO is formal group country to defend itself against outside aggression.
- NAFTA: North American Free Trade Agreement, was an agreement signed by Canada, Mexico, and the United States, creating a trilateral trade bloc in North America.
- New Hanseatic League: financial grouping of Denmark, Estonia, Finland, Ireland, Latvia, Lithuania, the Netherlands and Sweden
- Next Eleven (N11): Bangladesh, Egypt, Indonesia, Iran, Mexico, Nigeria, Pakistan, the Philippines, Turkey, South Korea, and Vietnam – identified as having a high potential of becoming, along with the BRICS countries, among the world's largest economies in the 21st century.
- NACE: North Atlantic and Central Europe
- NALA: North America and Latin America
- NORAM or NA or NAMER: North American Region (Canada, United States, and Mexico)
- Nordics: in addition to the Scandinavian countries Denmark, Norway and Sweden, also Finland and Iceland are included.
- Nordic-Baltic Eight (NB8): the Nordic and Baltic countries: Denmark, Estonia, Finland, Iceland, Latvia, Lithuania, Norway, and Sweden
- Nordic Council: Body of cooperation for Nordic countries.

== O ==
- OIC, the Organisation of Islamic Cooperation, is an international organization founded in 1969, consisting of 57 member states, with a collective population of over 1.8 billion as of 2015 with 54 countries being Muslim-majority countries.
- OAS, the Organization of American States, is a continental organization of the 35 independent nations within North, Central and South America
- OECD, the Organisation for Economic Co-operation and Development, to stimulate economic progress and world trade, countries committed to democracy and the market economy, most OECD members are high-income economies with a very high Human Development Index (HDI) and are regarded as developed countries.
- OECS, a group of island nations located in the Eastern Caribbean.
- OIAS, the Organization of Ibero-American States, an organization of Portuguese and Spanish Speaking Nations of the Americas, Africa, and Europe.
- Organization of Turkic States: an international organization comprising some of the Turkic countries (Turkey, Azerbaijan, Kazakhstan, Uzbekistan, and Kyrgyzstan).
- OPEC, the Organization of the Petroleum Exporting Countries, an organization of thirteen countries accounting for an estimated 42 percent of global oil production and 73 percent of the world's proven oil reserves. (OPEC+: the OPEC countries plus Russia)
- Open Balkan: The Open Balkan is an economic and political zone of three member states in the Balkans, those being Albania, North Macedonia and Serbia.
- Outer Seven: The seven founding members of the European Free Trade Association, in contrast to the Inner Six, founders of the competitor European Economic Community, the predecessor to the current European Union.
- Outposts of tyranny

== P ==
- P5, permanent members of the United Nations Security Council: China, France, Russia, the United Kingdom, and the United States.
- Pacific Alliance, a trade bloc of states that border the Pacific Ocean. Permanent members include Chile, Colombia, Mexico, and Peru.
- The Pacific Pumas, a political and economic grouping of countries along Latin America's Pacific coast that includes Chile, Colombia, Mexico and Peru. The term references the four larger Pacific Latin American emerging markets that share common trends of positive growth, stable macroeconomic foundations, improved governance and an openness to global integration.
- PALOP, the Portuguese-speaking African countries, also known as Lusophone Africa that includes: Angola, Cape Verde, Guinea-Bissau, Mozambique, São Tomé and Príncipe and Equatorial Guinea.
- Paris Club, a group of major creditor countries whose officials meet ten times a year in the city of Paris, with the intent to find coordinated and sustainable solutions to the payment difficulties experienced by debtor countries.
- PIGS, also PIIGS, the economies of the countries of Portugal, Greece, Spain, Italy and/or Ireland.
- PROSUR, the Forum for the Progress and Integration of South America.

== Q ==
- Quadrilateral Security Dialogue also known as QUAD is a strategic security dialogue between Australia, India, Japan, and the United States that is maintained by talks between member countries.

== R ==
- Rio Group, was an international organization of Latin American and some Caribbean states that was succeeded in 2010 by the Community of Latin American and Caribbean States.
- ROME: Rest of Middle East
- Russian world (with population that speak Russian): Armenia, Azerbaijan, Belarus, Estonia, Georgia, Kazakhstan, Kyrgyzstan, Latvia, Lithuania, Moldova, Russia, Tajikistan, Turkmenistan, Ukraine, Uzbekistan
- Russia–Syria–Iran–Iraq coalition or 4+1 (in which the "plus one" refers to Hezbollah of Lebanon)
- Rzeczpospolita: Polish–Lithuanian Commonwealth: (within parts of today's) Poland, Lithuania, Belarus, Ukraine

== S ==
- SAARC, a geopolitical union of nations in South Asia
- Six Nations Championship: rugby union competition by the men's teams of England, France, Ireland, Italy, Scotland and Wales
- SADC: the Southern African Development Community
- SCA: South and Central America
- Scandinavia: Denmark, Norway and Sweden (in some definitions, Finland is included due to strong historical ties to Sweden, and Iceland is sometimes included due to strong historical ties to Denmark and Norway).
- Schengen Area: a system of open borders encompassing many European states.
- Shanghai Cooperation Organisation (SCO): a Eurasian political, economic, and security organisation comprising: China, Kazakhstan, Kyrgyzstan, Russia, Tajikistan, Uzbekistan, India and Pakistan.
- SaarLorLux: Saarland, Lorraine, Luxembourg
- SEA: South-East Asia
- Southern Cone (Cono Sur): Argentina, Chile and Uruguay. Southern Brazil and Paraguay are occasionally included.
- South Asia: Afghanistan, Bangladesh, Bhutan, Maldives, Nepal, India, Pakistan and Sri Lanka
- South Atlantic Peace and Cooperation Zone (ZPCAS or ZOPACAS): group of nations along the Atlantic coasts of Sub-Saharan Africa and South America, formed with a special focus on opposing nuclear proliferation in the region
- SSA: Sub-Saharan Africa
- SWANA: Southwest Asia-North Africa, used as an alternative term for the wider Middle East.

== T ==
- TAKM: Turkey, Azerbaijan, Kyrgyzstan
- The Stans: Afghanistan, Kazakhstan, Kyrgyzstan, Pakistan, Tajikistan, Turkmenistan, Uzbekistan
- Tiger Cub Economies: a grouping of five newly industrialized emerging markets and middle powers in Southeast Asia: Indonesia, Malaysia, Philippines, Thailand, and Vietnam
- Three Seas Initiative: Baltic, Adriatic, Black Sea
- Trimarium (Three Seas, Trójmorze): running along a north–south axis from the Baltic Sea to the Adriatic and Black Seas in Central and Eastern Europe- Austria, Bulgaria, Croatia, the Czech Republic, Estonia, Greece, Hungary, Latvia, Lithuania, Poland, Romania, Slovakia, and Slovenia

== U ==
- United Nations (UN), an intergovernmental organization to promote international co-operation, 193 member states.
- United States of Poland: (unrealized concept of polity within) Poland, Lithuania, Belarus, Ukraine
- Union State, a Supranational union made up of Russia and Belarus.
- UNASUR: Union of South American Nations.

== V ==
- V4, Visegrád Group, an alliance of four Central European States: the Czech Republic, Hungary, Poland, and Slovakia.

== W ==
- Warsaw Pact (former): Soviet Union, Albania, Bulgaria, Czechoslovakia, East Germany, Hungary, Poland, Romania
- Weimar Triangle: France, Germany, Poland
- Weimar+: countries of Weimar Triangle plus Italy, Spain, the UK, and European Commission

== See also ==
- List of military alliances
- List of multilateral free-trade agreements
- United Nations geoscheme
- List of geographic acronyms and initialisms
- List of geographic portmanteaus
- List of geographic anagrams and ananyms
