= 2nd BRIC summit =

2010 international summit in Brasília, Brazil

2nd BRIC Summit Segunda cúpula do BRIC
- 15 April 2010
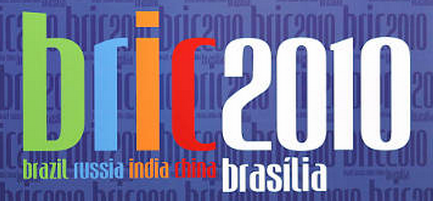

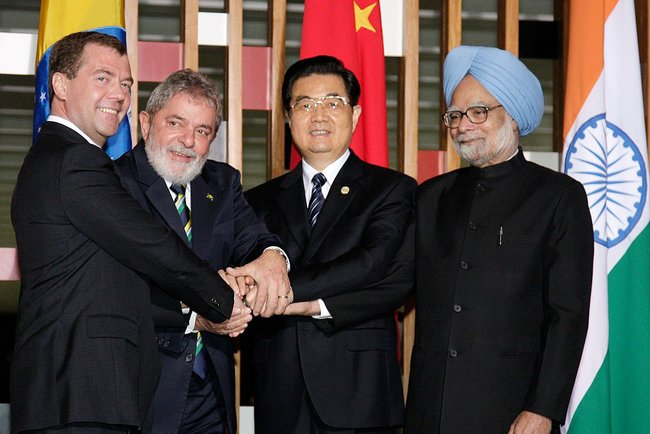
- Host country: Brazil
- Cities: Brasília
- Participants: Brazil; Russia; India; China

The 2010 BRIC summit took place in Brasília, Brazil on April 15, 2010. This was the second BRIC summit after Yekaterinburg in 2009. The meeting took place between the four heads of government from the BRIC states following bilateral meetings in the prior days.

== Overview ==
The acronym BRIC (for Brazil, Russia, India, China) was first used in a Goldman Sachs thesis projecting the economic potential of Brazil, Russia, India and China.

Previously, the 1st BRIC summit took place in Yekaterinburg, Russia in 2009 and discussed global issues. This year's summit follows the Washington Nuclear summit hosted by U.S. President Barack Obama which was attended by all four BRIC states.

Between 2003 and 2007, BRIC countries carried 65% of the expansion of global GDP. In 2009, the combined PPP GDP of the BRIC countries was US$16.3 trillion, or 23.4% of global total. From 2003 to 2008, Brazil trade with the other BRIC countries increased by 382%, or US$10.7 billion to US$51.7 billion.

== Participants ==
The heads of state and heads of government of the four countries participated.

**Core BRIC members** Host state and leader are shown in bold text.
Member		Represented by	Title
(Brazil)	**Brazil**	**Luiz Inácio Lula da Silva**	**President**
(Russia)	Russia	Dmitry Medvedev	President
(India)	India	Manmohan Singh	Prime Minister
(China)	China	Hu Jintao	General Secretary; President

Invited leaders

- South Africa: Jacob Zuma, President of South Africa
- Palestinian Authority: Riad Al-Malki, Foreign Minister of the Palestinian Authority

== Gallery of participating leaders ==
=== Members of BRIC ===
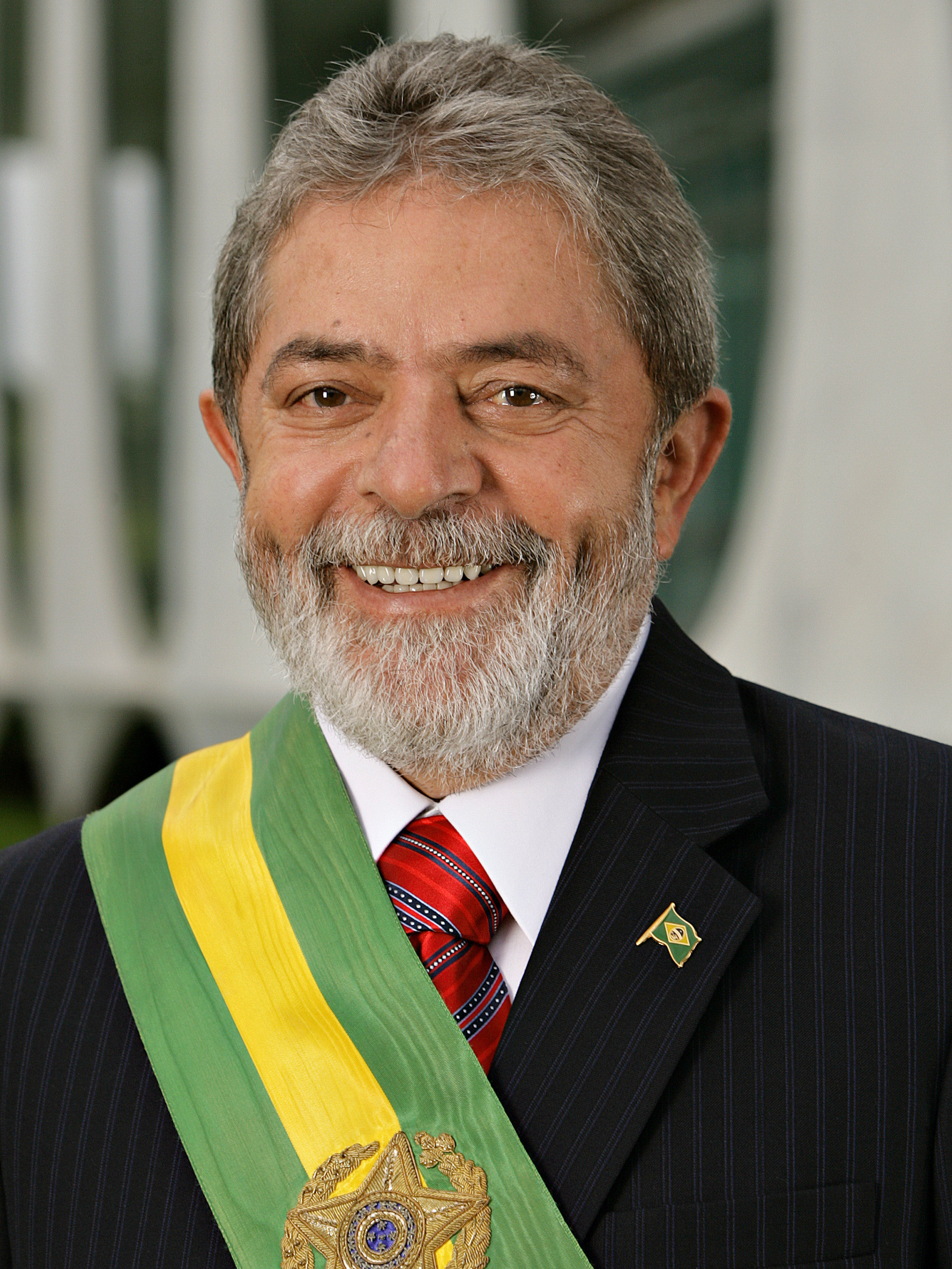
(Brazil) **Brazil**
**Lula da Silva, President (Host)**

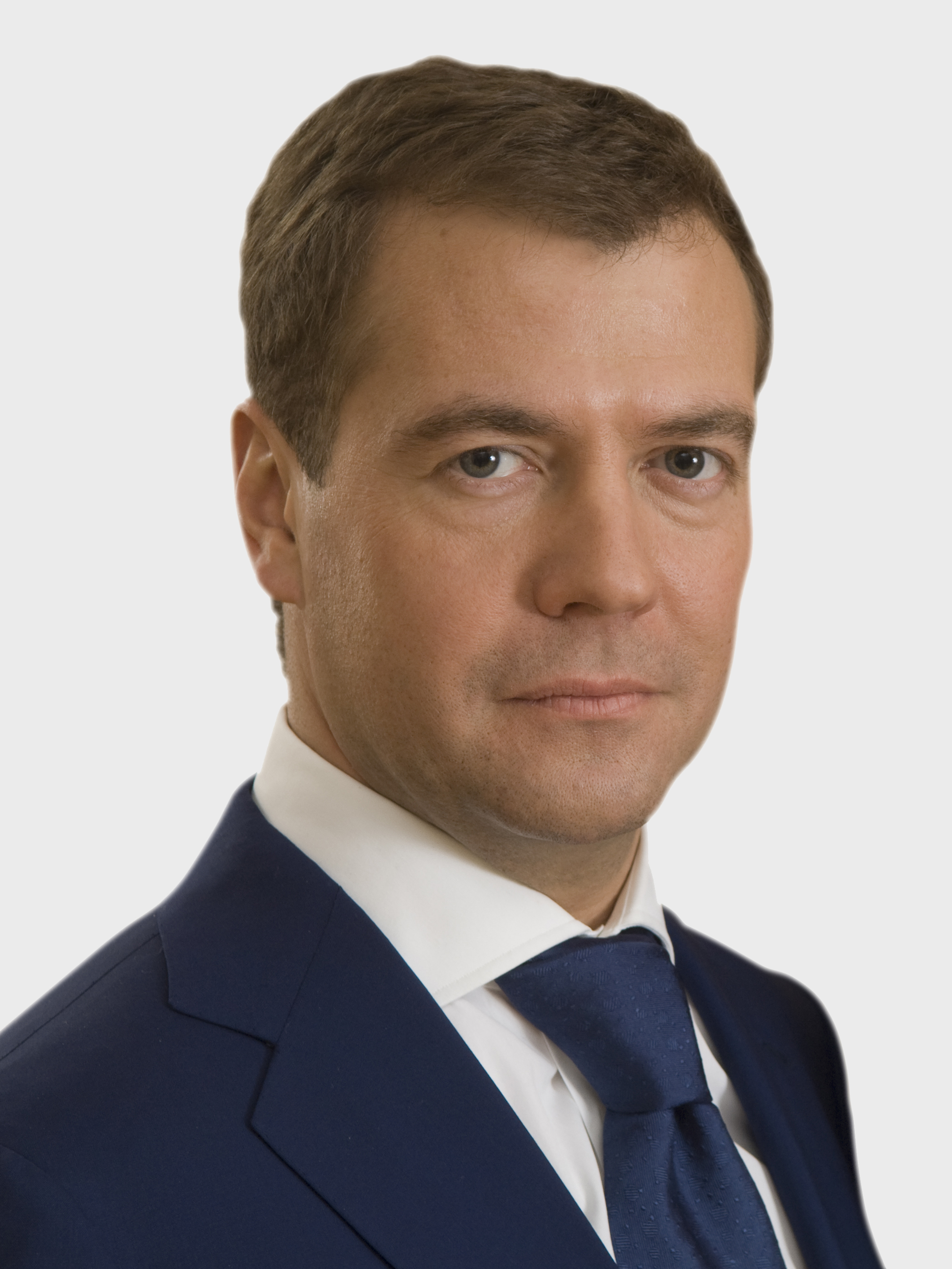
(Russia) **Russia**
**Dmitry Medvedev, President**

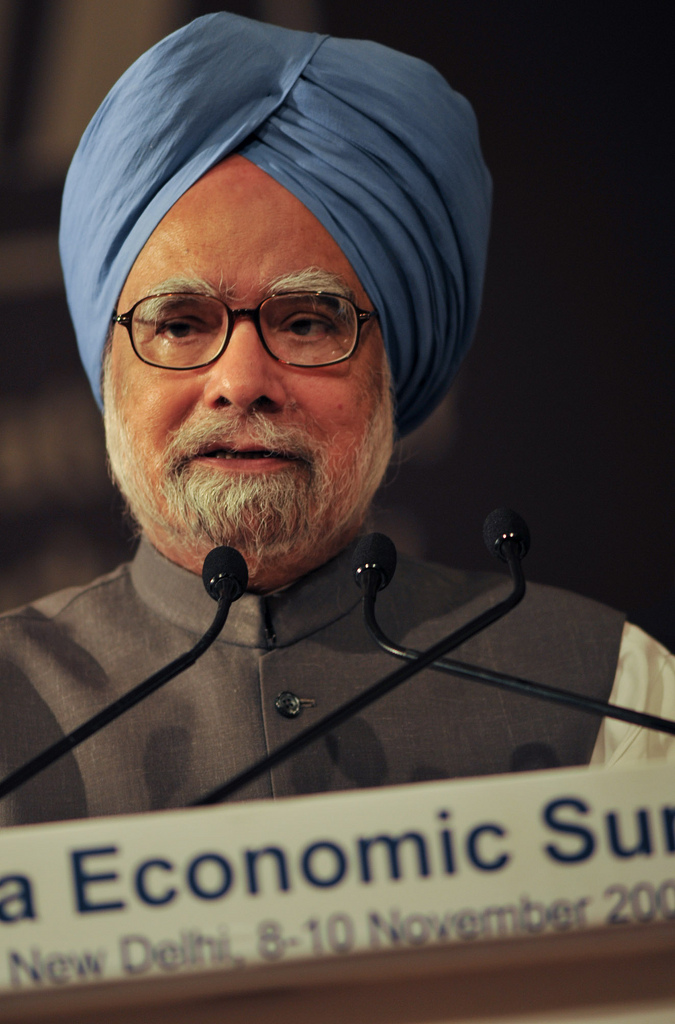
**India**
Manmohan Singh, Prime Minister

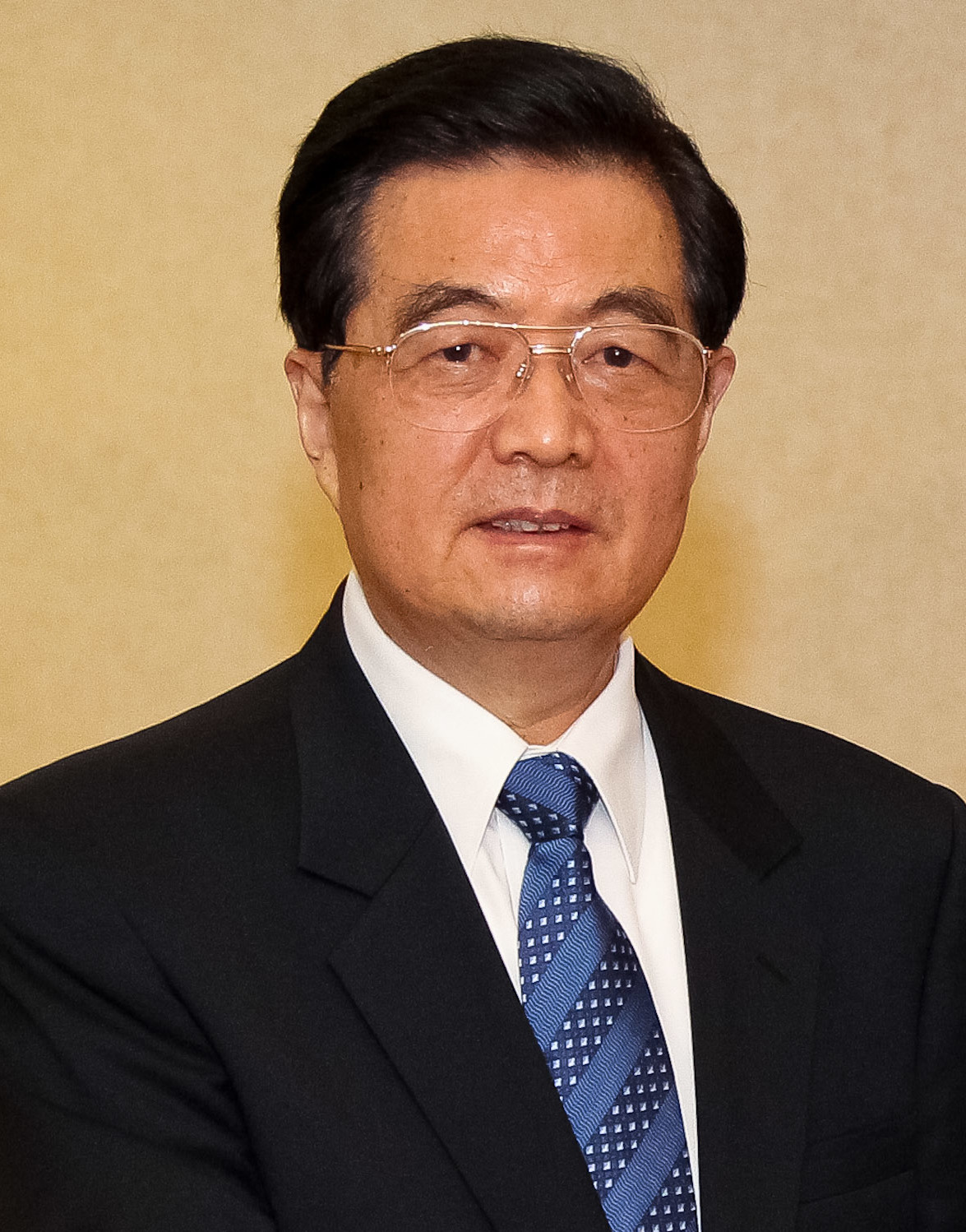
**China**
Hu Jintao, CCP General Secretary and President

=== Guests ===
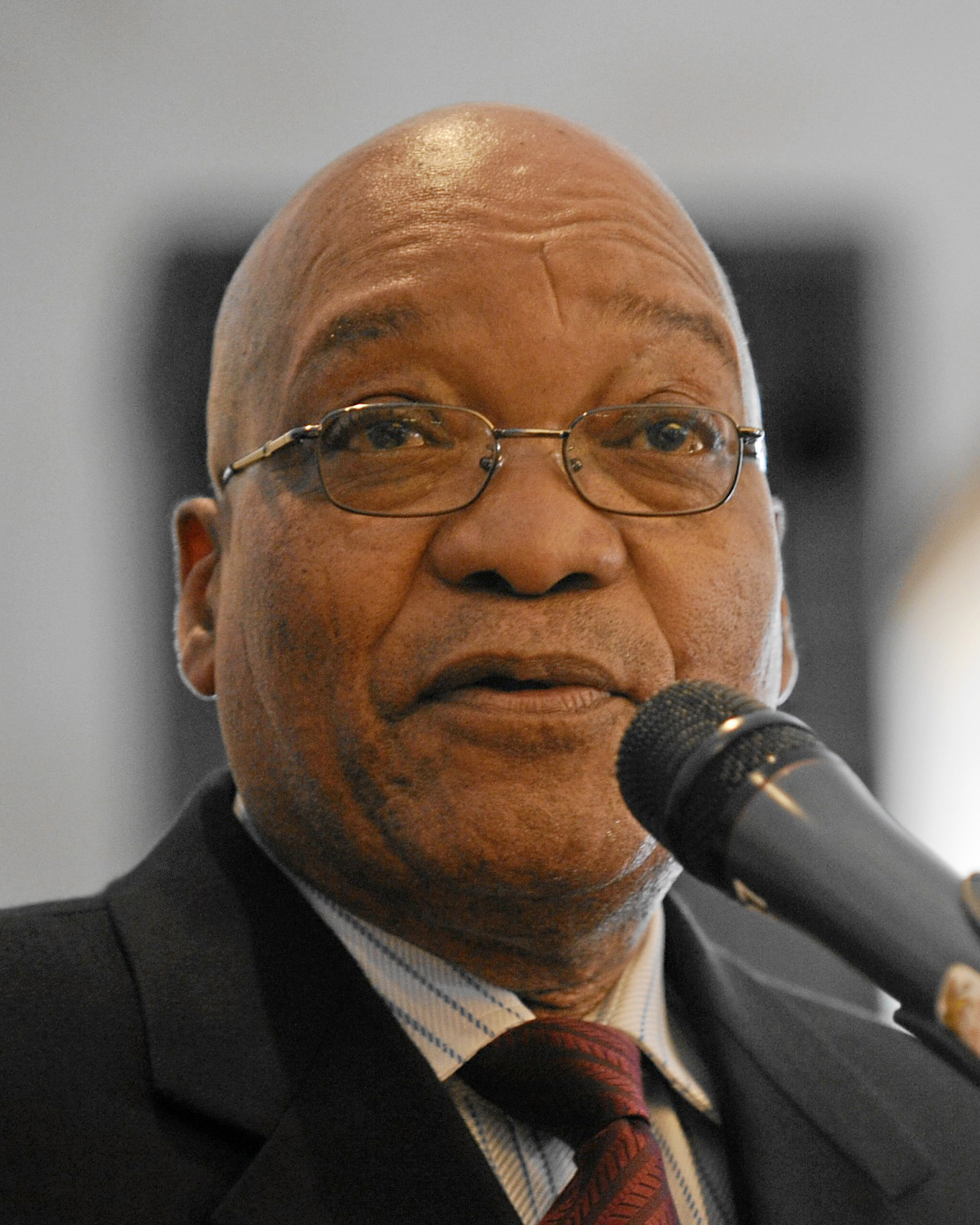
**South Africa**
Jacob Zuma, President

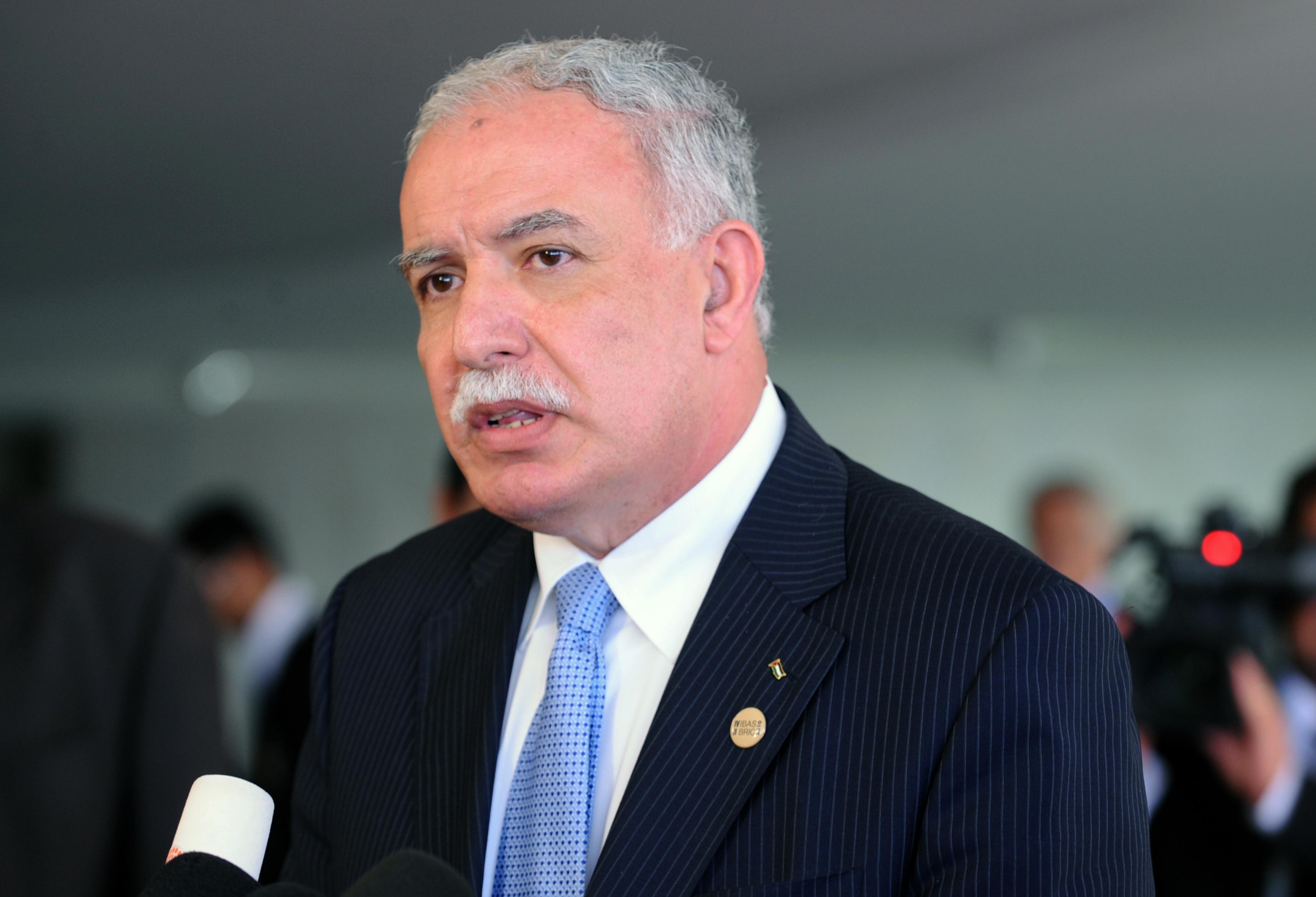
**Palestinian Authority**
Riad Al-Malki, Foreign Minister

== Other meetings ==
A few months before the summit, the Indian Foreign Minister, SM Krishna, met President Lula in Brasília, where he stressed for the need to accelerate relations between the three countries. He also emphasised India's commitment to IBSA as a symbol of "the spirit of South-South cooperation."

Days prior to the official summit, bilateral meetings also took place between Brazil and India, as well as between Brazil and China. India and China also agreed to work together instead of competitively signaling there is enough room for them both to grow together. The two also agreed to give greater market access to each other's products to boost trade.

Additionally, between April 13 to 16 other meetings and forums took place such as: the IBSA/BRIC Business Forum; meeting of development banks and commercial banks Meeting; a think-tank seminar; a cooperatives forum; and a meeting of representatives on strategy and security.

== Issues ==
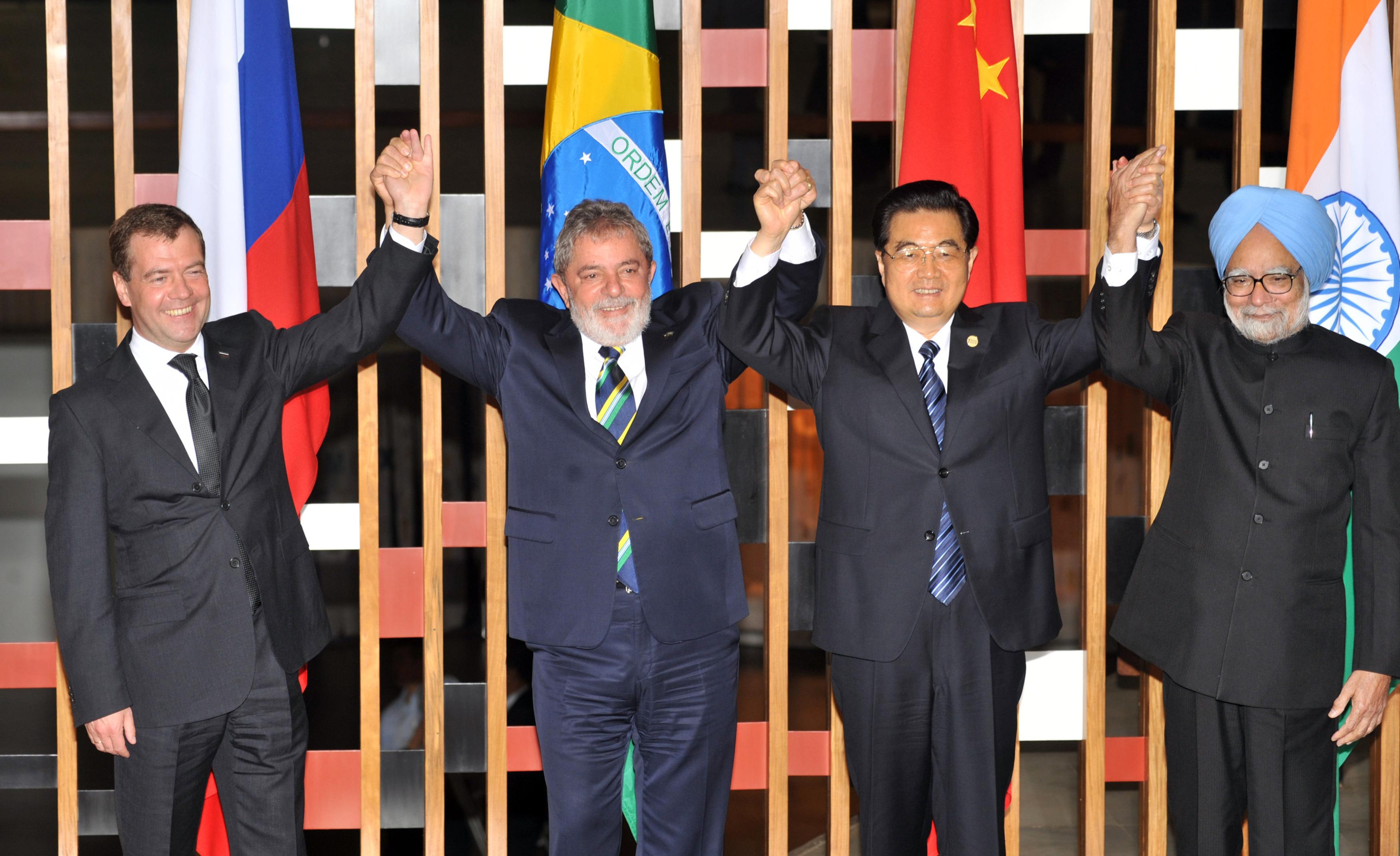
Picture of the BRIC national leaders at the event.

The leaders discussed various current issues including the Iran and nuclear weapons, development, the furtherance of the BRIC (and IBSA that was occurring at the same time) as an international body, the global economic situation at the time, reform of financial institutions, the financial G20, and cooperation and issues related to global governance.

However, China explicitly stated the Chinese Yuan was not discussed. Despite coming under heavy pressure to let their currency appreciate the Chinese appeared to be standing their ground. Despite the refusal to discuss this the currency fell.

=== Iran ===
The day before the summit Brazil expressed "affinity" with China towards the Iranian nuclear issue. Foreign Minister of Brazil, Celso Amorim, said "Our impression... is that the effectiveness of sanctions is debatable." He added that President Lula had brought up the same with the Indian Prime Minister Singh. In the same vein, the IBSA talk preceding the summit called for further talk on the Iranian issue.

=== Development ===
CCP General Secretary Hu Jintao showed China's willingness to be a positive partner in global development when he showed China's meteoric rise in saying: "The scale and complexity of the challenges that we face in the course of development are unmatched anywhere else in the world and have been rarely seen in human history. We must make persistent efforts for a long time to come. The Chinese people suffered so much in modern history, and we therefore value peace, stability, harmony and freedom more than anything else. A prosperous and growing China dedicated to peace and cooperation is willing and able to make new and even greater contribution to mankind's pursuit of peace and development."

=== Furtherance of BRIC ===
India took the initiative to call for improving the importance of the BRIC and IBSA groups. Indian PM Singh also called for closer cooperation in the fields of energy and food security, as well as tapping into the potential of other sectors such as trade and investment, science and technology and infrastructure. He added that pooling together the experiences of each can lead to more inclusive growth. "We are four large countries with abundant resources, large populations and diverse societies... We aspire for rapid growth for ourselves and for an external environment that is conducive to our development goals. [Our people] expect us to work together so as to bring the benefits of inclusive social and economic development to them. Our grouping includes two of the largest energy producers and two of the largest consumers in the world. We can cooperate in both upstream and downstream areas, and in the development of new fuels and clean energy technologies."

== Criticisms ==
The CCP General Secretary, Hu Jintao, brought forward his departure to April 15 (before the actual talks) instead of April 17 due to the earthquake in Qinghai. Despite this he did continue with the working meeting and signed a bilateral agreement between the four countries.

== Reactions ==
At least one Indian media outlet call the meet "answer to the G7 platform of top industrialised countries." It added that the meet "underscore[d] a shared quest for greater collective influence within the changing geometry of the international system."

Investors cited India and China as the best bets of BRIC, of which India was seen as providing investors with the best bet over the long haul, however it also faces challenges to finance the "modernization of its woeful infrastructure given its high debt levels and ambivalence towards foreign investment and privatization." But it was added that "these faster growing markets will translate into above average returns."

== See also ==
- Foreign relations of Brazil
- Foreign relations of China
- Foreign relations of Russia
- Foreign relations of India
