= BRIC (economics term) =

Term for a group of four emerging national economies

- Type: Foreign investment strategies grouping
- Membership: Brazil; Russia; India; China

Establishment
  - Term coined by Jim O'Neill: 2001
  - Goldman Sachs closes BRIC fund: 2015

Area
  - Total: 38,464,219 km^{2} (14,851,118 sq mi)

Population
  - 2022 estimate: 3,157,441,470
- GDP (PPP): 2022 estimate
  - Total: $49.967 trillion
- GDP (nominal): 2022 estimate
  - Total: $27.107 trillion

BRIC (Brazil, Russia, India, and China) is the foreign investment strategies grouping of Brazil, Russia, India, and China. The term has been rendered as "the BRICs", "the BRIC countries", "the BRIC economies", and the "Big Four". It is a leading example of "acronym investing" where investments are targeted to a group of otherwise disparate markets which share a common feature. The term has been expanded by observers to include other countries such as South Africa (BRICS), Mexico (BRIMC), and South Korea (BRICK), among others.

The term was coined by British economist Jim O'Neill and later championed by his employer Goldman Sachs in 2001. O'Neill identified the four countries as emerging markets and rising economic powers which were at a similar stage of newly advanced economic development. Goldman Sachs, of which O'Neill was the head of global economics research, would continue reporting and investing in their BRIC fund until 2015. In a 2023 retrospective article, O'Neill commented that after the term's initial proposal, it gained an outsized popularilty in the 2000s and 2010s to explain the economic conditions of the four countries. He also conceded that the reports published by Goldman Sachs, which presented an optimistic possibility of the BRIC economies in the year 2050, were most likely not going to come true as economic downturns in the 2010s and early 2020s severely altered the trajectory of each country's economies.

The acronym was co-opted by the countries themselves beginning in the late-2000s. The 1st BRIC summit in 2009, which founded the BRICS organization, was held between the leaders of the four countries, with later summits involving South Africa beginning in 2010. O'Neill commented on the 2010 summit by drawing a distinction between his BRIC term and the BRICS organisation, arguing that South Africa was too small as an economy to join the BRIC ranks. In further comments in 2023, O'Neill stressed that he "never encouraged [the countries] to develop a political club" and that the organization appeared to exist just as "a club that the U.S. is not a part of."

== Reports ==
=== O'Neill's thesis (2001) ===
In 2001, Jim O'Neill, a global economist at Goldman Sachs at the time, proposed that the economic potential of Brazil, Russia, India and China is such that they could become among the most dominant economies by 2050. At the time, these countries encompassed over 25% of the world's land coverage and 40% of the world's population and held a combined GDP (PPP) of $20 trillion. On almost every scale, they would be the largest entity on the global stage and were among the largest and fastest-growing emerging markets.

Politically, they have taken steps to increase their cooperation, mainly as a way of influencing the United States position on major trade accords, or, through the implicit threat of political cooperation, as a way of extracting political concessions from the United States, such as the proposed nuclear cooperation with India.

=== "Dreaming with BRICS: The Path to 2050" (2003) ===
The BRIC thesis recognizes that Brazil, Russia, India and China have changed their political systems to embrace global capitalism. Goldman Sachs predicts that China and India, respectively, will become the dominant global suppliers of manufactured goods and services, while Brazil and Russia will become similarly dominant as suppliers of raw materials. Of the four countries, Brazil remains the only polity that can continue all elements, meaning manufacturing, services, and resource supplying simultaneously. Cooperation is thus hypothesized to be a logical next step among the BRICs because Brazil and Russia together form the logical commodity suppliers.

In 2016, an Australian economist predicted that in 2050, China and India will be first and second respectively in terms of GDP per capita spending, surpassing the United States. Brazil was predicted to be in the fifth position. This was attributed due to the global economic center shifting from the Atlantic to the Asia Pacific region.

=== Follow-up report (2004) ===
The economics team at Goldman Sachs released a follow-up report to its initial BRIC study in 2004. The report states that in the BRIC nations, the number of people with an annual income over a threshold of $3,000 will double in number within three years and reach 800 million people within a decade. This predicted a massive rise in the size of the middle class in these nations. The report also includes calculations that in 2025, the number of people in BRIC nations earning over $15,000 would reach over 200 million people. This indicates that a huge pickup in demand will not be restricted to basic goods but impact higher-priced goods as well. According to the report, first China and then a decade later India would begin to dominate the world economy. However, it was noted that despite the balance of future growth swinging so decisively towards the BRIC economies, the average level of individuals in the more advanced economies will continue to far outstrip the BRIC economic average for the foreseeable future.

The report also highlights India's inefficient energy consumption at the time as well as the dramatic under-representation of these economies in the global capital markets. The report also emphasizes the enormous populations that exist within the BRIC nations, which makes it relatively easy for their aggregate wealth to eclipse the G6, while per-capita income levels remained far below the norm of today's industrialized countries. This phenomenon, too, will affect world markets as multinational corporations will attempt to take advantage of the enormous potential markets in the BRIC countries. This would present itself in the automobile and other manufactured goods markets, as companies would produce far cheaper goods affordable to the consumers within the BRIC economies in lieu of the luxury models that may traditionally bring the most revenue. The report cites India and China as examples of countries which had already begun making their presence felt in the service and manufacturing sector respectively in the global arena, with developed economies already taking note of this.

=== "India's Rising Growth Potential" (2007) ===
A second follow-up report was compiled by lead authors Tushar Poddar and Eva Yi in January 2007. The report unveiled updated projection figures attributed to the rising growth trends in India since 2003. Goldman Sachs asserts that "India's influence on the world economy will be bigger and quicker than implied in our previously published BRICs research". They noted significant areas of research and development and expansion that is happening in the country, which the report predicts would lead to the prosperity of the growing middle class. Demographically, India had 10 of the 30 fastest-growing urban areas in the world at the time. Based on trends at the time, an estimated 700 million Indians will move to cities by 2050. Such a demographic change would have significant implications for demand for urban infrastructure, real estate, and services.

In the revised 2007 figures, based on increased and sustaining growth, more inflows into foreign direct investment, Goldman Sachs predicts that "from 2007 to 2020, India's GDP per capita in US$ terms will quadruple", and that the Indian economy will surpass the United States (in US$) by 2043. At the same time, the report indicated that Russia, while continuing its dominance of the European energy market, would continue to struggle economically, as its population declines.

=== "EM Equity in Two Decades: A Changing Landscape" (2010) ===
According to a 2010 report from Goldman Sachs, China might surpass the United States in equity market capitalization terms by 2030 and become the single largest equity market in the world. By 2020, America's GDP might be only slightly larger than China's GDP. Together, the four BRICs may account for 41% of the world's market capitalization by 2030, the report said.

=== Further developments ===
By 2015, Goldman Sachs quietly closed down its BRIC fund after lost 88 percent of its asset value since 2010, instead channeling the fund into emerging markets countries. Jim O'Neill, the inventor of the term "BRIC", was the former chief economist of Goldman Sachs and retired from the firm in 2013.

The head of emerging markets for Morgan Stanley Investment Management, Ruchir Sharma, released a book in 2012 entitled Breakout Nations. Sharma posited that such rapid growth for more than a decade is difficult to maintain, with outside commenters connecting this to the potential for the BRIC economies to slow their rapid economic rise. This idea was partially accepted by O'Neill in 2023, who commented that in the time since the initial proposal of the BRIC term, the BRIC economies were unlikely to reach the 2050 projections published in the Goldman Sachs reported. O'Neill attributed this to post-2012 developments including government decisions and consequences from the Great Recession and impact of COVID-19 pandemic.

In late 2010, China surpassed Japan's GDP for the first time, with China's GDP standing at $5.88 trillion compared to Japan's $5.47 trillion. China thus became the world's second-largest economy after the United States. For the year 2013, for the first time China surpassed $4 trillion in world trade and become the world's largest trading country, consisting of $2.21 trillion in exports and $1.95 trillion in imports. While the United States for 11 months of 2013 world trade figure totaling $3.5 trillion and seems cannot beat China. China's world trade balance in 2013 had a surplus of almost $260 billion, a 12.8% increased from the prior year.

According to the National Institute of Economic and Social Research, based on International Monetary Fund figures, in 2012 Brazil became the sixth-largest economy in the world by overtaking United Kingdom with $2.52 trillion and $2.48 trillion, respectively. Comparatively in 2010, the Brazilian economy was worth $2.09 trillion while UK economy was worth $2.25 trillion. The significant increases were attributed to a Brazilian economic boom in high food and oil prices. Since the beginning of the Great Recession, in Q3 2013 the economy of Brazil contracted by 0.5 percent compared with the previous quarter, being the first contraction since Q1 2009.

In June 2012, following Standard & Poor's (S&P) report that India's growth outlook could deteriorate if policymaking and governance did not improve, Fitch Ratings cut its credit outlook for India from stable to negative while maintaining its BBB− rating, the lowest investment-grade rating. A week before Fitch released the rating, S&P stated that India could become the first of the BRIC countries to lose investment-grade status.

Based on a March 2011 Forbes report, the BRIC countries counted 301 billionaires among their combined populations, exceeding the number of billionaires in Europe, which stood at 300 in 2011.

== Statistics ==
Proportion of world (countries with data) nominal GDP for the countries with the top 10 highest nominal GDP in 2018, from 1980 to 2018 with IMF projections until 2024. Countries marked with an asterisk are non-G8 countries.

A Goldman Sachs paper published in December 2005 explained why Mexico was not included in the original BRICs. The Economist publishes an annual table of socio-economic national statistics in its "Pocket World in Figures". Extrapolating the global rankings from their 2008 Edition for the BRIC countries and economies in relation to various categories provides an interesting touchstone in relation to the economic underpinnings of the BRIC thesis. It also illustrates how, despite their divergent economic bases, the economic indicators are remarkably similar in global rankings between the different economies. It also suggests that, while economic arguments can be made for linking Mexico into the BRIC thesis, the case for including South Korea looks considerably weaker.

=== General statistics ===
Statistics
Categories	Brazil	Russia	India	China
Area	5th	1st	7th	3rd
Population	5th	9th	1st	2nd
Population growth rate	128th	177th	98th	148th
Labor force	5th	6th	2nd	1st
GDP (nominal)	8th	10th	5th	2nd
GDP (PPP)	7th	6th	3rd	1st
GDP (nominal) per capita	57th	47th	139th	72nd
GDP (PPP) per capita	75th	55th	126th	72nd
GDP (real) growth rate	180th	177th	3rd	12th
Human Development Index	85th	55th	114th	79th
Exports	6th	8th	12th	1st
Imports	21st	17th	8th	2nd
Current account balance	187th	5th	186th	2nd
Received FDI	13th	16th	19th	4th
Foreign exchange reserves	10th	6th	9th	1st
External debt	20th	21st	22nd	12th
Public debt	42nd	190th	104th	184th
Electricity consumption	9th	4th	3rd	1st
Renewable energy source	3rd	5th	6th	1st
Number of mobile phones	4th	5th	2nd	1st
Number of internet users	5th	6th	2nd	1st
Motor vehicle production	9th	15th	5th	1st
Military expenditures	11th	4th	5th	2nd
Active troops	15th	5th	2nd	1st
UN Peacekeepers	24th	77th	3rd	9th
Rail network	10th	3rd	4th	2nd
Road network	4th	7th	2nd	3rd

=== Goldman Sachs prediction ===
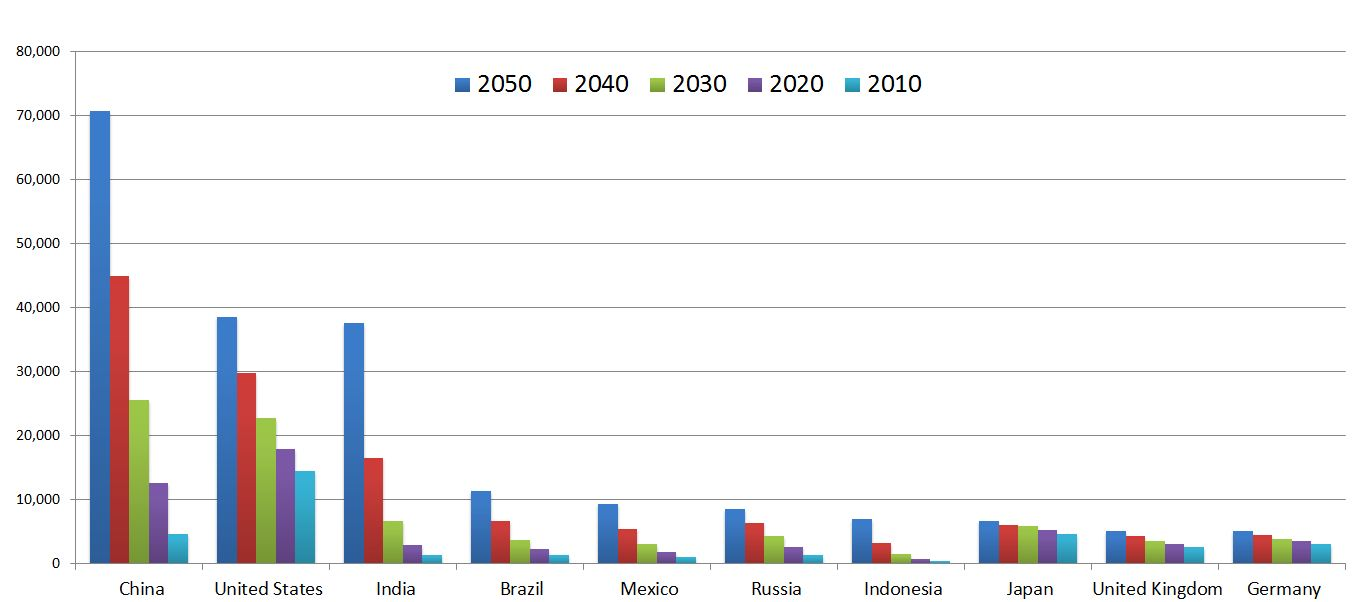
Projection of the ten largest economies in the world to 2050, measured in GDP (billions of 2006 USD), according to Goldman Sachs in 2007

Gross Domestic Product in 2006 US$ billions
Rank 2050	Country	2050	2045	2040	2035	2030	2030 USDA	2025	2020	2015	2010	2006	Percent increase from 2006 to 2050
1	China	70,710	57,310	45,022	34,348	25,610	22,200	18,437	12,630	8,133	4,667	2,682	2536%
2	India	38,668	25,278	16,510	10,514	6,683	6,600	4,316	2,848	1,900	1,256	909	4043%
3	United States	38,514	33,904	29,823	26,097	22,817	24,800	20,087	17,978	16,194	14,535	13,245	190%
4	Brazil	11,366	8,740	6,631	4,963	3,720	4,000	2,831	2,194	1,720	2,087	1,064	968%
5	Mexico	9,340	7,204	5,471	4,102	3,068	2,300	2,303	1,742	1,327	1,009	851	997%
6	Russia	8,580	7,420	6,320	5,265	4,265	2,400	3,341	2,554	1,900	1,371	982	773%

Note: All data above is from Goldman Sachs, except the 2030 USDA column is data from U.S. Department of Agriculture (2030 USDA) about World's 20 Largest Economies in 2030, but only 16 match with Goldman Sachs data. In 2030 USDA, Mexico and Indonesia will topple South Korea (please see Section Proposed inclusions). There is no South Africa of BRIC S in the above table. In 2030, the sole country from Africa is Nigeria and the US is still number one, but China almost overtakes the US.

Gross Domestic Product per capita (real)
Rank 2050	Country	2050	2045	2040	2035	2030	2025	2020	2015	2010	2006	Percent increase from 2006 to 2050
1	United States	91,683	83,489	76,044	69,019	62,717	57,446	53,502	50,200	47,014	44,379	106%
2	South Korea	90,294	75,979	63,924	53,449	44,602	36,813	29,868	26,012	21,602	18,161	397%
3	United Kingdom	79,234	73,807	67,391	61,049	55,904	52,220	49,173	45,591	41,543	38,108	107%
4	Russia	78,435	65,708	54,221	43,800	34,368	26,061	19,311	13,971	9,833	6,909	1,037%
5	Canada	76,002	69,531	63,464	57,728	52,663	48,621	45,961	43,449	40,541	38,071	99%
6	France	75,253	68,252	62,136	56,562	52,327	48,429	44,811	41,332	38,380	36,045	108%
7	Germany	68,253	62,658	57,118	51,710	47,263	45,033	43,223	40,589	37,474	34,588	97%
8	Japan	66,846	60,492	55,756	52,345	49,975	46,419	42,385	38,650	36,194	34,021	96%
9	Mexico	63,149	49,393	38,255	29,417	22,694	17,685	13,979	11,176	8,972	7,918	697%
10	Italy	58,545	52,760	48,070	44,948	43,195	41,358	38,990	35,908	32,948	31,123	88%
11	Brazil	49,759	38,149	29,026	21,924	16,694	12,996	10,375	8,427	6,882	5,657	779%
12	China	49,650	39,719	30,951	23,511	17,522	12,688	8,829	5,837	3,463	2,041	2,332%
13	Turkey	45,595	34,971	26,602	20,046	15,188	11,743	9,291	7,460	6,005	5,545	722%
14	Vietnam	33,472	23,932	16,623	11,148	7,245	4,583	2,834	1,707	1,001	655	5,010%
15	Iran	32,676	26,231	20,746	15,979	12,139	9,328	7,345	5,888	4,652	3,768	767%
16	Indonesia	22,395	15,642	10,784	7,365	5,123	3,711	2,813	2,197	1,724	1,508	1,385%
17	India	20,836	14,446	9,802	6,524	4,360	2,979	2,091	1,492	1,061	817	2,450%
18	Pakistan	20,500	14,025	9,443	6,287	4,287	3,080	2,352	1,880	1,531	1,281	1,500%
19	Philippines	20,388	14,260	9,815	6,678	4,635	3,372	2,591	2,075	1,688	1,312	1,453%
20	Nigeria	13,014	8,934	6,117	4,191	2,944	2,161	1,665	1,332	1,087	919	1,316%
21	Egypt	11,786	7,066	5,183	3,775	2,744	2,035	1,568	1,260	897	778	808%
22	Bangladesh	5,235	3,767	2,698	1,917	1,384	1,027	790	627	510	427	1,125%

Gross Domestic Product in 2006 US$ billions
Groups	Countries	2050	2045	2040	2035	2030	2025	2020	2015	2010	2006
BRICS	Brazil, Russia, India, China, South Africa	128,324	98,757	74,483	55,090	40,278	28,925	20,226	13,653	8,640	5,637
G7	Canada, France, Germany, Italy, Japan, United Kingdom, US	66,039	59,475	53,617	48,281	43,745	39,858	36,781	33,414	30,437	28,005

The following three tables are lists of economies by incremental GDP from 2006 to 2050 by Goldman Sachs. They illustrate that the BRICs and N11 nations are replacing G7 nations as the main contributors to the world's economic growth. From 2020 to 2050, nine of the ten largest countries by incremental GDP are occupied by the BRICs and N11 nations, in which the United States remains to be the only G7 member as one of the three biggest contributors to the global economic growth.

List of Economies by Incremental Nominal GDP from 2006 to 2020
Rank	Country	Incremental GDP in billions of 2006 US$
1	China	9,948
2	United States	4,733
3	India	1,939
4	Russia	1,572
5	Brazil	1,130
6	Mexico	891
7	Japan	888
8	United Kingdom	791
9	Germany	668
10	Italy	635
11	France	621
11	South Korea	621
13	Canada	440
14	Indonesia	402
15	Turkey	350
16	Iran	299
17	Vietnam	218
18	Nigeria	185
19	Philippines	172
20	Pakistan	139
21	Egypt	128
22	Bangladesh	87

List of Economies by Incremental Nominal GDP from 2020 to 2035
Rank	Country	Incremental GDP in billions of 2006 US$
1	China	21,718
2	United States	8,119
3	India	7,666
4	Brazil	2,769
5	Russia	2,711
6	Mexico	2,360
7	Indonesia	1,440
8	South Korea	1,136
9	Turkey	976
10	Vietnam	896
11	United Kingdom	836
12	Nigeria	777
13	France	752
14	Iran	729
15	Japan	662
16	Canada	602
17	Philippines	593
18	Germany	529
18	Egypt	502
20	Pakistan	441
21	Bangladesh	301
22	Italy	220

List of economies by incremental nominal GDP from 2035 to 2050
Rank	Country	Incremental GDP in billions of 2006 US$
1	China	36,362
2	India	27,154
3	United States	12,417
4	Brazil	6,403
5	Mexico	5,238
6	Indonesia	4,818
7	Nigeria	3,557
8	Russia	3,315
9	Vietnam	2,438
10	Turkey	2,227
11	Philippines	2,128
12	Egypt	1,884
13	South Korea	1,439
14	Iran	1,390
15	Pakistan	1,376
16	United Kingdom	1,196
17	France	1,025
18	Bangladesh	1,015
19	Germany	976
20	Canada	847
21	Japan	791
22	Italy	506

At the World Economic Forum 2011, there were 365 corporate executives from BRIC and other emerging nations out of 1000 participants. It was a record number of executives from emerging markets. Nomura Holdings Inc's co-head of global investment banking said that "It's a reflection of where economic power and influence is starting to move." The International Monetary Fund estimated emerging markets might expand 6.5 percent in 2011, more than double the 2.5 percent rate for developed countries. BRIC's takeover made record by 22 percent of global deals or increase by 74 percent in one year and more than quadrupled in the last five years.

According to The World Bank Doing Business report 2019 the BRIC economies introduced a total of 21 reforms, with getting electricity and trading across borders the most common areas of improvement.

== History ==
=== Organisation ===
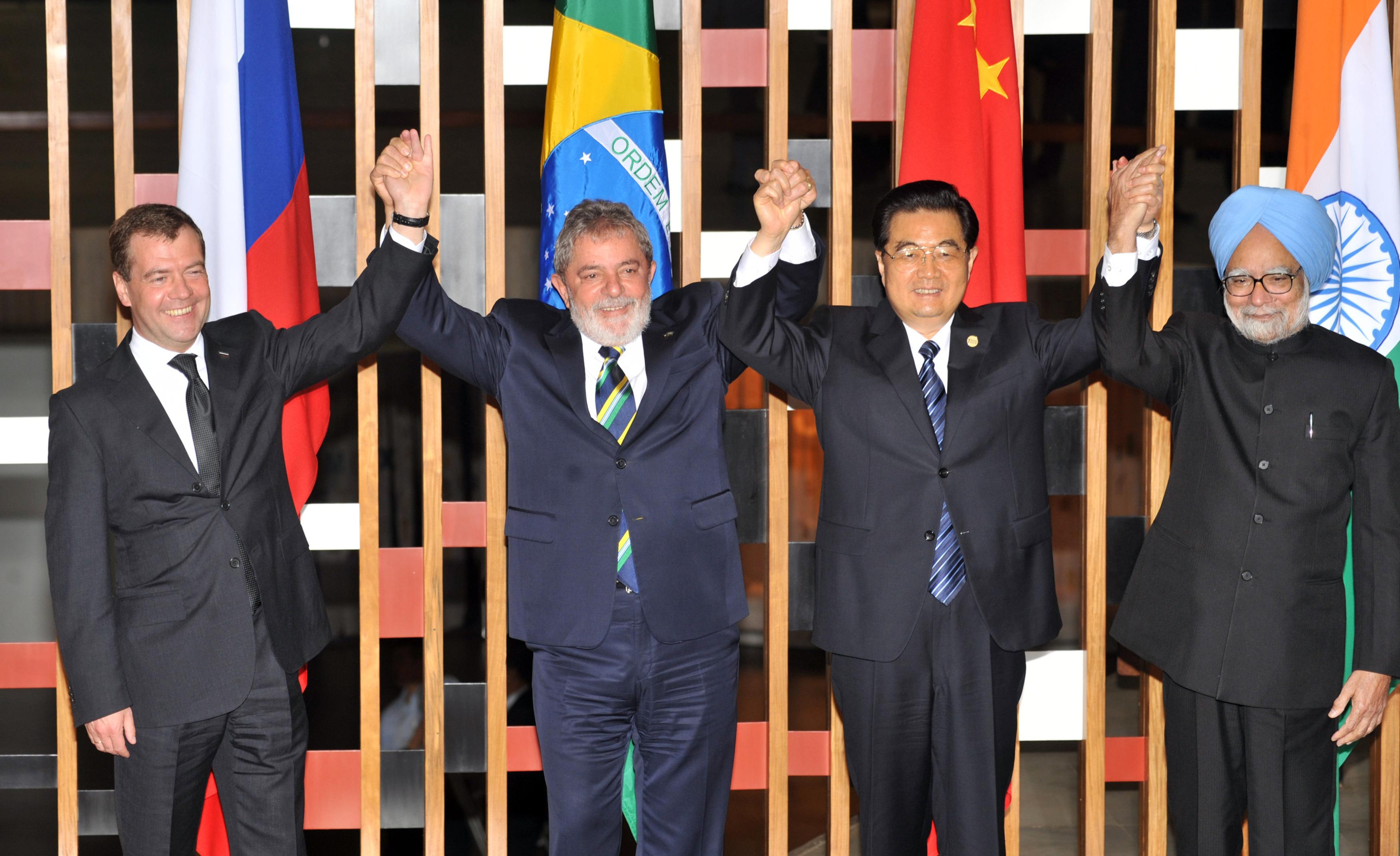
The BRIC leaders in 2010

Various sources refer to a purported "original" BRIC agreement that predates the Goldman Sachs thesis. Some of these sources claim that President Vladimir Putin of Russia was the driving force behind this original cooperative coalition of developing BRIC countries. However, thus far, no text has been made public of any formal agreement to which all four BRIC states are signatories. This does not mean, however, that they have not reached a multitude of bilateral or even quadrilateral agreements. Evidence of agreements of this type are abundant and are available on the foreign ministry websites of each of the four countries. Trilateral agreements and frameworks made among the BRICs include the Shanghai Cooperation Organisation (member states include Russia and China, observers include India) and the IBSA Trilateral Forum, which unites Brazil, India, and South Africa in annual dialogues. The Russia-India-China (RIC) strategic triangle was envisaged by Russian prime minister Yevgeny Primakov in the 1990s.

The BRIC organization formally began in 2009 with its inaugural summit. South Africa sought BRIC membership since 2009 and the process for formal admission began as early as August 2010. South Africa was officially admitted as a BRIC nation on 24 December 2010, after being invited by China and the other BRIC countries to join the group. The capital "S" in BRICS stands for South Africa. President Jacob Zuma attend the BRICS summit in Sanya in April 2011 as a full member. South Africa stands at a unique position to influence African economic growth and investment. According to Jim O'Neill of Goldman Sachs who originally coined the term, Africa's combined current gross domestic product is reasonably similar to that of Brazil and Russia, and slightly above that of India.

O'Neill expressed surprise when South Africa joined the BRIC organisation as South Africa's economy was a quarter of the size of Russia's (the least economically powerful BRIC nation). He believed that the potential was there but did not anticipate inclusion of South Africa at this stage. O’Neill stated in 2011 that the countries "don’t have the same interests. The wealth per head is very different, the politics is very different, and the philosophy and their natural economic edge is different." Martyn Davies, a South African emerging markets expert, argued that the decision to invite South Africa made little commercial sense but was politically astute given China's attempts to establish a foothold in Africa. Further, South Africa's inclusion in BRICS may translate to greater South African support for China in global fora. He has great belief that the "S" in "BRICS" could be replaced eventually by SADC. O'Neill would later criticize the organisation in a 2021 article for Project Syndicate, in which he wrote that the BRICS countries "have so far proven incapable of uniting as a meaningful global force" and felt in 2024 that "each year also brings further confirmation that the grouping serves no real purpose beyond generating symbolic gestures and lofty rhetoric". In further comments in 2023, O'Neill stressed that he "never encouraged [the countries] to develop a political club" and that the organisation appeared to exist just as "a club that the US is not a part of."

=== Marketing ===
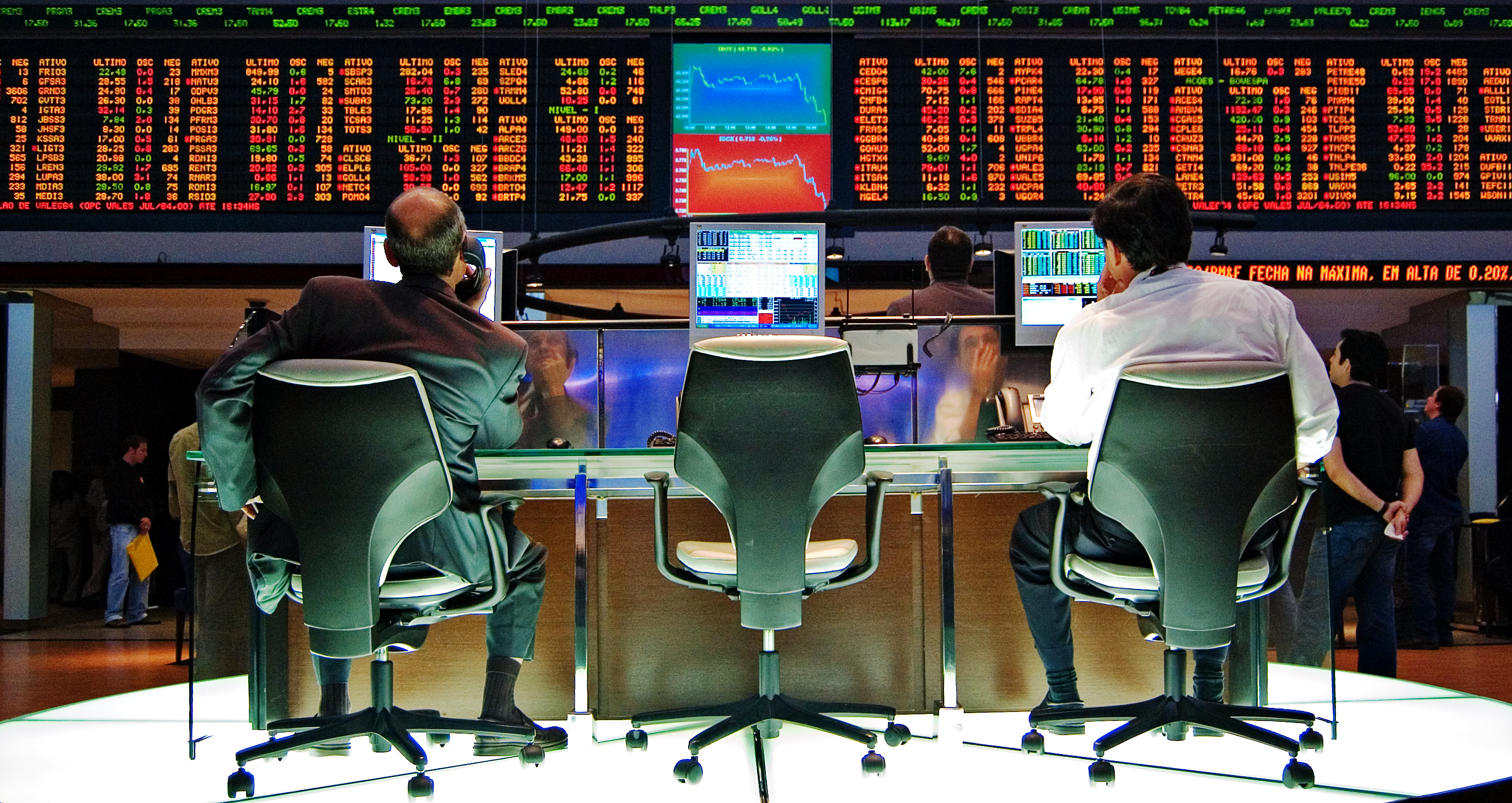
The São Paulo Stock Exchange is the third-largest exchange operator by market value in the world.

The BRIC term is also used by companies who refer to the four named countries as key to their emerging markets strategies. By comparison, the reduced acronym IC would not be attractive, although the term "Chindia" is often used. BRIC's study specifically focuses on large countries, not necessarily the wealthiest or the most productive and was never intended to be an investment thesis. If investors read Goldman's research carefully and agreed with the conclusions, then they would gain exposure to Asian debt and equity markets rather than to Latin America. According to estimates provided by the USDA, the wealthiest regions outside of the G6 in 2015 will be Hong Kong, South Korea and Singapore. Combined with China and India, these five economies are likely to be the world's five most influential economies outside of the G6.

On the other hand, when the "R" in BRIC is extended beyond Russia and is used as a loose term to include all of Eastern Europe as well, then the BRIC story becomes more compelling. At issue are the multiple serious problems which confront Russia (potentially unstable government, environmental degradation, critical lack of modern infrastructure, etc.), and the comparatively much lower growth rate seen in Brazil. However, Brazil's lower growth rate obscures the fact that the country is wealthier than China or India on a per-capita basis, has a more developed and global integrated financial system and has an economy potentially more diverse than the other BRICs due to its raw material and manufacturing potential. Many other Eastern European countries, such as Poland, Romania, the Czech Republic, Slovakia, Hungary, Bulgaria, and several others were able to continually sustain high economic growth rates and do not experience some of the problems that Russia experiences or experience them to a lesser extent. In terms of GDP per capita in 2008, Brazil ranked 64th, Russia 42nd, India 113th, and China 89th. By comparison, South Korea ranked 24th and Singapore 3rd.

Brazil's stock market, the Bovespa, has gone from approximately 9,000 in September 2002 to over 70,000 in May 2008. Government policies have favored investment (lowering interest rates), retiring foreign debt and expanding growth, and a reformulation of the tax system is being voted in the congress. The British author and researcher Mark Kobayashi-Hillary wrote a book in 2007, along with contributors Nandan Nilekani and Shiv Nada, titled Building a Future with BRICs for European publisher Springer Verlag that examines the growth of the BRICs region and its effect on global sourcing.

=== International law ===
Brazilian lawyer and author Adler Martins has published a paper called "Contratos Internacionais entre os países do BRIC" (International Agreements Among BRIC countries) which highlights the international conventions ratified by the BRIC countries, which allow them to maintain trade and investment activities safely within the group. Martin's study is being further developed by the Federal University of the Minas Gerais State, in Brazil.

=== Financial diversification ===
Some observers have argued that geographic diversification would eventually generate superior risk-adjusted returns for long-term global investors by reducing overall portfolio risk while capturing some of the higher rates of return offered by the emerging markets of Asia, Eastern Europe and Latin America. By doing so, these institutional investors have contributed to the financial and economic development of key emerging nations such as Brazil, India, China, and Russia. For global investors, India and China constitute both large-scale production platforms and reservoirs of new consumers, whereas Russia is viewed essentially as an exporter of oil and commodities- Brazil and Latin America being somehow "in the middle".

=== Criticism ===
Academics and experts have suggested that China is in a league of its own compared to the other BRIC countries. As David Rothkopf wrote in Foreign Policy, "Without China, the BRICs are just the BRI, a bland, soft cheese that is primarily known for the whine [sic] that goes with it. China is the muscle of the group and the Chinese know it. They have effective veto power over any BRIC initiatives because without them, who cares really? They are the one with the big reserves. They are the biggest potential market. They are the U.S. partner in the G2 (imagine the coverage a G2 meeting gets vs. a G8 meeting) and the E2 (no climate deal without them) and so on." Deutsche Bank Research stated in a report that "economically, financially and politically, China overshadows and will continue to overshadow the other BRICs". It added that China's economy is larger than that of the three other BRIC economies (Brazil, Russia, and India) combined. Moreover, China's exports and its official foreign-exchange reserves are more than twice as large as those of the other BRICs combined. In that perspective, some pension investment experts have argued that "China alone accounts for more than 70% of the combined GDP growth generated by the BRIC countries [from 1999 to 2010]: if there is a BRIC miracle it's first and foremost a Chinese one". The "growth gap" between China and other large emerging economies such as Brazil, Russia and India can be attributed to a large extent to China's early focus on ambitious infrastructure projects: while China invested roughly 9% of its GDP on infrastructure in the 1990s and 2000s, most emerging economies invested only 2% to 5% of their GDP. This considerable spending gap allowed the Chinese economy to grow at near-optimal conditions while many South American and South Asian economies suffered from various development bottlenecks (poor transportation, aging power grids, mediocre schools). In 2024, Jim O'Neill himself, when referring to the BRICS organisation, said that "without the Chinese presence, I don't think there would be much real importance, at all, to the BRICS group" due to the country's influence and power relative to other members.

Other critics suggest that BRIC is nothing more than a neat acronym for the four largest emerging market economies, but in economic and political terms nothing else links the four (apart from the fact that they are all big emerging markets). While China and India are manufacturing-based economies and rely on imports, Brazil and Russia are large exporters of natural resources. The Economist, in a special report on Brazil, expressed the following view: "In some ways, Brazil is the steadiest of the BRICs. Unlike China and Russia, it is a full-blooded democracy; unlike India, it has no serious disputes with its neighbors. It is the only BRIC without a nuclear bomb". The Heritage Foundation's Indices of Economic Freedom, which measures factors such as protection of property rights and free trade ranks Brazil "moderately free" above the other BRICs, which are ranked as "mostly unfree". Henry Kissinger has stated that the BRIC nations have no hope of acting together as a coherent bloc in world affairs and that any cooperation will be the result of forces acting on the individual nations.

In a not-so-subtle dig critical of the term as nothing more than a shorthand for emerging markets generally, critics have suggested a correlating term, CEMENT (Countries in Emerging Markets Excluded by New Terminology). Whilst they accept there has been spectacular growth of the BRIC economies, these gains have largely been the result of the strength of emerging markets generally, and that strength comes through having BRICs and CEMENT.

== Proposed inclusions ==
Mexico and South Korea are currently the world's 13th and 15th largest by nominal GDP just behind the BRIC and G7 economies. Both are experiencing rapid GDP growth of 5% every year, a figure comparable to Brazil from the original BRICs. Jim O'Neill, creator of the economic thesis, stated that in 2001 when the paper was created, it did not consider Mexico, but today it has been included because the country is experiencing the same factors that the other countries first included present. While South Korea was not originally included in the BRICs, recent solid economic growth led to Goldman Sachs proposing to add Mexico and South Korea to the BRICs, changing the acronym to BRIMCK, with Jim O'Neill pointing out that Korea "is better placed than most others to realize its potential due to its growth-supportive fundamentals".

A Goldman Sachs paper published later in December 2005 explained why Mexico and South Korea were not included in the original BRICs. According to the paper, among the other countries they looked at, only Mexico and South Korea have the potential to rival the BRICs, but they are economies that they decided to exclude initially because they looked to them as already more developed. However, due to the popularity of the Goldman Sachs thesis, "BRIMC" and "BRICK" are becoming more generic marketing terms to refer to these six countries. Because of the popularity of the Goldman Sachs thesis "BRIC", this term has sometimes been extended whereby "BRICK" (K for South Korea) and "BRIMC" (M for Mexico) refer to these proposed expansions. Other proposed groupings include "BRICA" (GCC Arab countries—Saudi Arabia, Qatar, Kuwait, Bahrain, Oman and the United Arab Emirates) and "BRICET" (including Eastern Europe and Turkey) and have become more generic marketing terms to refer to these emerging markets.

In an August 2010 op-ed, Jim O'Neill of Goldman Sachs argued that Africa could be considered the next BRIC. Analysts from rival banks have sought to move beyond the BRIC concept, by introducing their own groupings of emerging markets. Proposals include CIVETs (Colombia, Indonesia, Vietnam, Egypt, Turkey and South Africa), the EAGLES (Emerging and Growth-Leading Economies) and the 7 percent club (which includes those countries which have averaged economic growth of at least 7 percent a year).

In their paper "BRICs and Beyond", Goldman Sachs stated that "Mexico, the four BRIC countries and South Korea should not be really thought of as emerging markets in the classical sense", adding that they are a "critical part of the modern globalised economy" and "just as central to its functioning as the current G7".

The term is primarily used in the economic and financial spheres as well as in academia. Its usage has grown specially in the investment sector, where it is used to refer to the bonds emitted by these emerging markets governments.

O'Neill would later coin several other terms for groupings of emerging economies at various stages. First, the term "The Next Eleven" referred to Bangladesh, Egypt, Indonesia, Iran, Mexico, Nigeria, Pakistan, the Philippines, South Korea, Turkey, and Vietnam, arguing they would be among the world's largest economies in the 21st century. O'Neill next used the term MIKT for Mexico, Indonesia, South Korea, and Turkey. MINT was another acronym coined by O'Neill standing for Mexico, Indonesia, Nigeria, and Turkey. CIVETS is a comparable economic grouping and has been cited along with BRIC as examples of "acronym investing", in which investments are targeted to a group of otherwise disparate markets that share a common feature.

=== Mexico ===
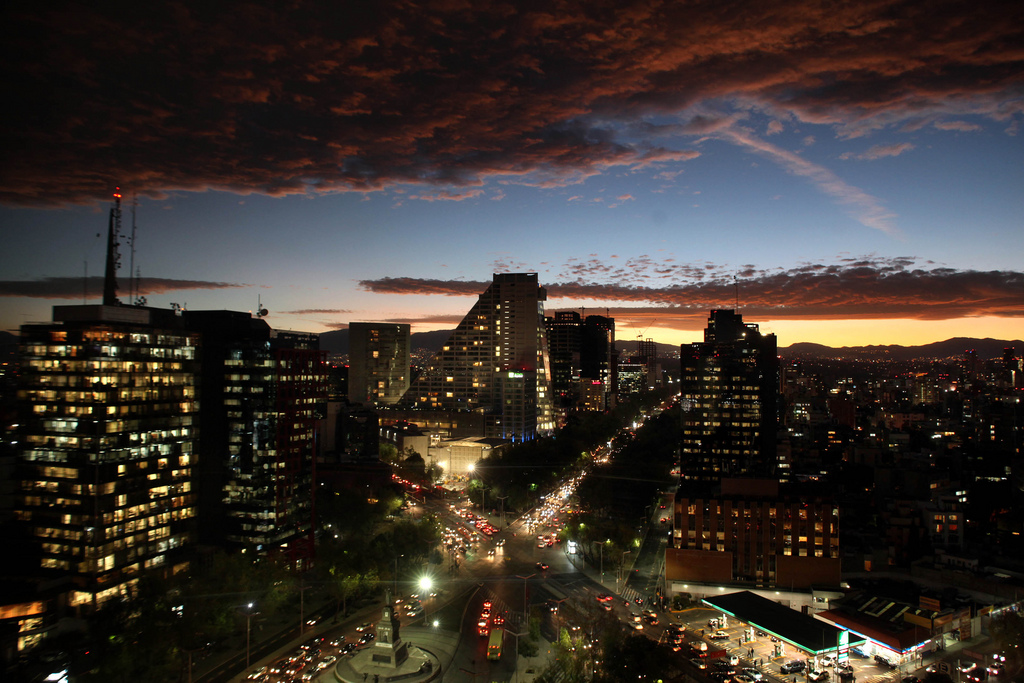
Mexico City

Primarily, along with the BRICs, Goldman Sachs argues that the economic potential of Brazil, Russia, India, Mexico and China is such that they may become (with the United States) the six most dominant economies by 2050. Due to Mexico's rapidly advancing infrastructure, increasing middle class and rapidly declining poverty rates it is expected to have a higher GDP per capita than all but three European countries by 2050, this newfound local wealth also contributes to the nation's economy by creating a large domestic consumer market which in turn creates more jobs.

Projection of Mexico's economy in 2050
GDP in USD	$9.340 trillion
GDP per capita	$63,149
GDP growth (2015–2050)	4.0%
Total population	142 million

=== South Korea ===
Commentators such as William Pesek from Bloomberg argue that Korea is "Another 'BRIC' in Global Wall", suggesting that it stands out from the Next Eleven economies with its BRIC-like growth rate, despite its Human Development Index being higher than some of the world's most advanced economies, including France, United Kingdom, Austria, Denmark, Finland and Belgium. South Korean workers are the wealthiest among major Asian countries, with a higher income than Japan and the strongest growth rate in the OECD. More importantly, it has a significantly higher Growth Environment Score (Goldman Sachs' way of measuring the long-term sustainability of growth) than all of the BRICs or N-11s. According to the IMF, South Korea's GDP measured by purchasing power parity is already larger than Canada and Spain. In terms of GDP per capita (PPP), South Korea overtook Spain in 2010. According to Citibank, South Korea will continue by overtaking Germany, Britain, Australia and Sweden by 2020, surpassing Canada, Switzerland, Netherlands and Norway by 2030 and taking over the United States by 2040 to become the world's wealthiest major economy. While measuring the South Korean economy by nominal GDP is inaccurate as the South Korean won is artificially kept low to boost exports, the IMF predicted South Korea's nominal GDP and GDP per capita will surpass Spain in 2015. Economists from other investment firms argue that even when measured by nominal GDP per capita, South Korea will achieve over $145,000 in 2040, surpassing the United States, suggesting that wealth is more important than size for bond investors, stating that Korea's credit rating will be rated AAA sooner than 2050.

==== United Korea ====
In September 2009, Goldman Sachs published its 188th Global Economics Paper named "A United Korea?" which highlighted in detail the potential economic power of a United Korea, which would surpass all current G7 countries except the United States and Japan within 30–40 years of reunification, estimating GDP to surpass $6 trillion by 2050. The young, skilled labor and large amount of natural resources from the North combined with advanced technology, infrastructure and large amount of capital in the South, as well as Korea's strategic location connecting three economic powers, would likely create an economy larger than the bulk of the G7. A reunited Korea could occur sometime before 2050 according to some outside observers.

Projection of the Korean economy in 2050
	United Korea	South Korea	North Korea
GDP in USD	$6.056 trillion	$4.073 trillion	$1.982 trillion
GDP per capita	$86,000	$96,000	$70,000
GDP growth (2015–2050)	4.8%	3.9%	11.4%
Total population	71 million	42 million	28 million

== See also ==
- List of country groupings
- 3G countries

== Bibliography ==
- Elder, Miriam, and Leahy, Joe, et al., Who's who: Bric leaders take their place at the top table, Financial Times, London, 25 September 2008
- Firzli, M. Nicolas, "Forecasting the Future: The BRICs and the China Model", JTW/ USAK Research Center, 9 March 2011
- Kateb, Alexandre, Les nouvelles puissances mondiales. Pourquoi les BRIC changent le monde" (The new global powers. Why the BRIC change the world) (in French), Paris : Ellipses, 2011, 272 p. ISBN 978-2-7298-6473-6
- O'Neill, Jim, BRICs could point the way out of the Economic Mire, Financial Times, London, 23 September 2008, p. 28.
- Mark Kobayashi-Hillary, 'Building a Future with BRICs: The Next Decade for Offshoring' (Nov 2007). ISBN 978-3-540-46453-2.
- James D. Sidaway (2012) 'Geographies of Development: New Maps, New Visions?', The Professional Geographer, 64:1, 49–62.
- J. Vercueil, Les pays émergents. Brésil-Russie-Inde-Chine... Mutations économiques et nouveaux défis (Emerging Countries. Brazil – Russia – India – China... Economic Transformations and new Challenges) (in French), Paris : Bréal, 2010, 207 p. ISBN 978-2-7495-0957-0
- Paulo Borba Casella, "BRIC : Brésil, Russie, Inde, Chine et Afrique du Sud – A l'heure d'un nouvel ordre juridique international", éd. A.Pedone, Paris, Sep 2011, EAN ISBN 978-2-233-00626-4
