= CIVETS =

Group of six emerging-market countries

CIVETS countries: Colombia, Indonesia, Vietnam, Egypt, Turkey, and South Africa

CIVETS is an acronym for six emerging market countries identified for their rapid economic development, namely Colombia, Indonesia, Vietnam, Egypt, Turkey, and South Africa. The term was coined in 2009 by Robert Ward of the Economist Intelligence Unit to describe nations demonstrating particularly strong growth potential. Common characteristics include "diverse and dynamic" economies, "young, growing population[s]", and "relatively sophisticated financial systems".

CIVETS is comparable to similar economic groupings such as BRICS and the Next Eleven, both devised by Goldman Sachs economist Jim O'Neill to identify markets deemed most advantageous to investors. All three terms are examples of "acronym investing", in which investments are targeted to a group of otherwise disparate markets that share a common feature.

== Etymology ==
The acronym CIVETS was first coined by Robert Ward, Global Director of the Global Forecasting Team of the Economist Intelligence Unit (EIU) in late 2009. The grouping was conceptually inspired by BRIC, a term developed in 2001 by Jim O'Neill of the American investment bank Goldman Sachs to describe four rapidly growing countries he believed would challenge the existing global economic order: Brazil, Russia, India, and China. Similarly, Ward identified CIVETS as having some of the strongest economic potential.

CIVETS was further disseminated and popularized by Michael Geoghegan, president of the British multinational bank HSBC, following a speech to the Hong Kong Chamber of Commerce in April 2010. Geoghegan compared these countries to the civet, a small cat-like omnivorous mammal that lives in tropical regions of Africa and Asia and eats and partially digests coffee cherries, passing a transformed coffee bean that is a highly valued commodity.

== Characteristics ==
Though diverse in terms of geography, culture, and political system, CIVETS share several elements, most notably diversified economies and soaring young populations. Other similar aspects include relative political stability (particularly by historic standards), strong investment in infrastructure and higher education, reasonably sophisticated financial systems, comparatively low levels of public debt, and high overall economic growth.

Michael Geoghegan has called these countries "the new BRICS" because of their potential as second-generation emerging economies. In 2010, he stated that "emerging markets will grow three times as fast as developed countries this year", adding that the center of gravity of the world was moving towards the East and the South (Asia and Latin America).

In addition to being seen as attractive markets, the role of CIVETS countries in global governance is also discussed, especially at the G20, of which Indonesia, South Africa, and Turkey are members. All three nations are perceived as "development providers investing in peer-to-peer learning and horizontal partnerships and (...) are bound to become strategic players at the G20, UN and IFI levels". In view of this, during the 2011 annual meetings of the International Monetary Fund and the World Bank, the economy and finance ministers of the CIVETS countries established a formal mechanism for communication and coordination.

All CIVETS countries except Colombia and South Africa are also part of the "Next Eleven" (N-11), a group of nations that will purportedly become some of the world's largest economies in the 21st century.

== Economic data ==
Member	Population (2021)	GDP (nom.) US$ (2026 est.)	GDP (PPP) US$ (2026 est.)	GDP (nom.) per capita US$ (2026 est.)	GDP (PPP) per capita US$ (2026 est.)	real GDP growth (2026)	Debt-to-GDP % (2026 est.)
Colombia	51,516,562	539.530	1,258.920	10,104	23,576	▲2.3%	▲60.9%
Indonesia	273,753,191	1,539.872	5,449.145	5,362	18,973	▲5.0%	▲41.5%
Vietnam	97,468,029	527.266	2,025.331	5,115	19,649	▲7.1%	▼29.8%
Egypt	109,262,178	429.645	2,568.688	3,904	23,321	▲4.2%	▲87.0%
Turkey	84,775,404	1,640.223	4,025.249	19,018	46,672	▲3.4%	▲25.5%
South Africa	59,392,255	479.964	1,070.835	7,503	16,740	▲1.0%	▲78.9%

== Challenges and criticisms ==
All CIVETS members share similar challenges to sustained economic growth, including unemployment, corruption, inequality, and susceptibility to market volatility. The grouping has also been criticized for lacking economic rigor, serving as a "marketing ploy" intended to assuage investors' reluctance to invest in less developed or stable economies. Richard Titherington, chief investment officer of emerging equities at JP Morgan Chase, dismissed the concept of acronym investments generally, noting that many countries that are grouped together have little in common. Detractors claim that such groupings "do not take into account different stages of development of the countries involved and risk sidelining other promising markets".

In 2013, HSBC closed its CIVETS fund, which was identified by some analysts as indicative of the grouping's underperformance.

== See also ==
- List of country groupings
- List of multilateral free trade agreements
- PIGS (economics)
