= 1st BRIC summit =

2009 international summit in Yekaterinburg, Russia

1st BRIC Summit I саммит БРИК
- 16 June 2009
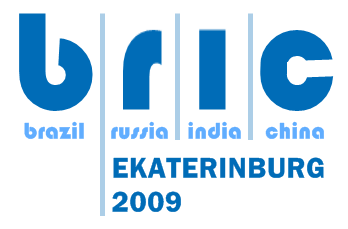

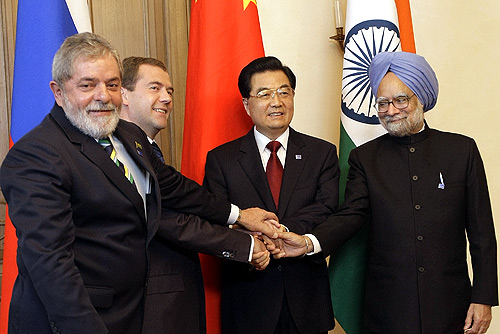
- Host country: Russia
- Cities: Yekaterinburg
- Participants: Brazil; Russia; India; China

The inaugural BRIC summit took place in Yekaterinburg, Russia on June 16, 2009. The four heads of state or heads of government from the BRIC countries attended.

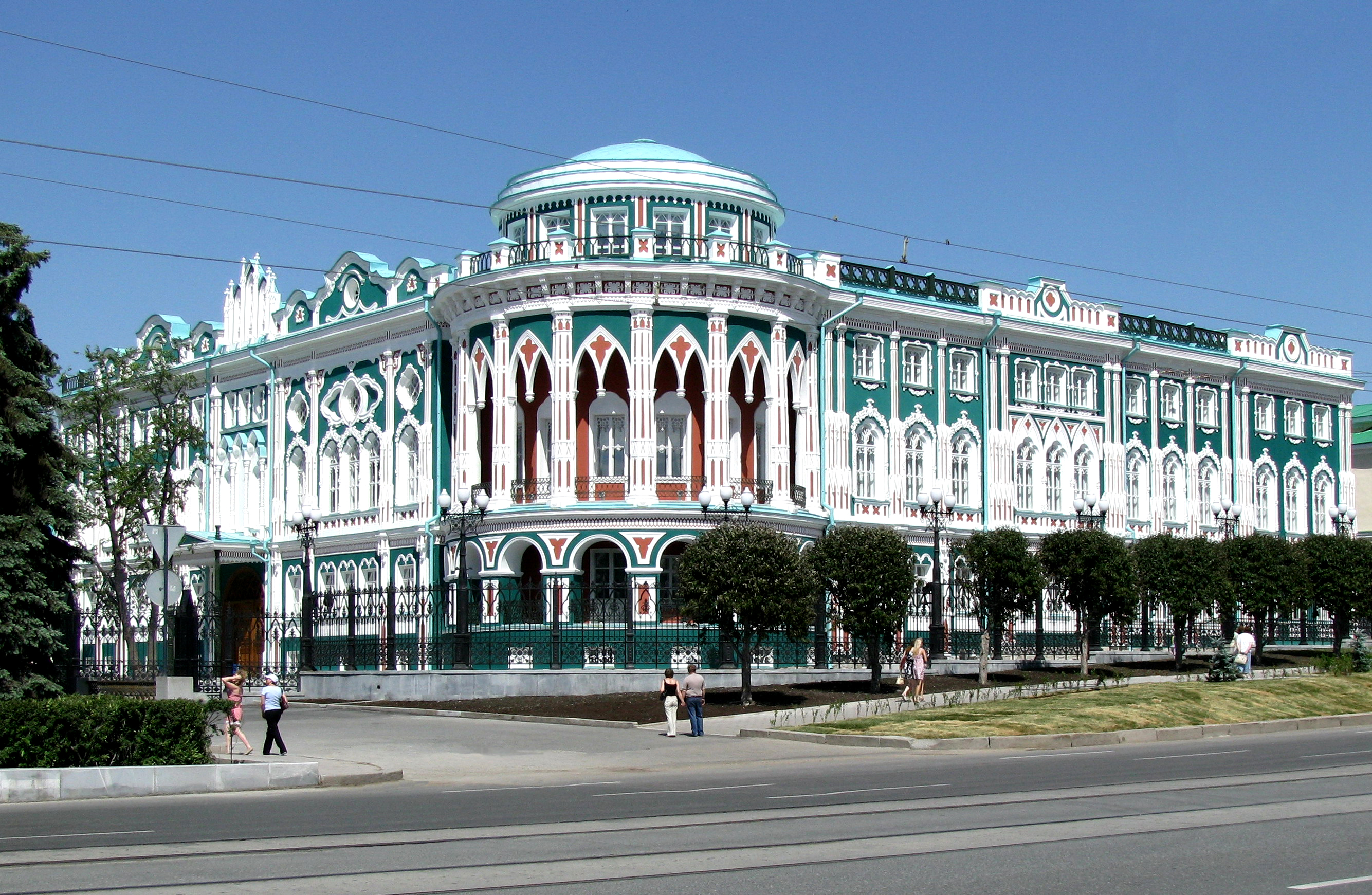
Sevastyanov House – the main venue of the summit.

== Overview ==
The acronym BRIC (for Brazil, Russia, India, China) was first used in a Goldman Sachs thesis projecting that the economic potential of Brazil, Russia, India and China is such that they may become among the five most dominant economies by the year 2050. In 2009, the four countries produced about 15 percent of the world’s gross domestic product and held about 40 percent of the gold and hard currency reserves.

Political dialogue between the BRIC countries began in New York in September 2006, with a meeting of the BRIC foreign ministers. Four high-level meetings have followed, including a full-scale meeting in Yekaterinburg, Russia, on May 16, 2008.

== Participants ==
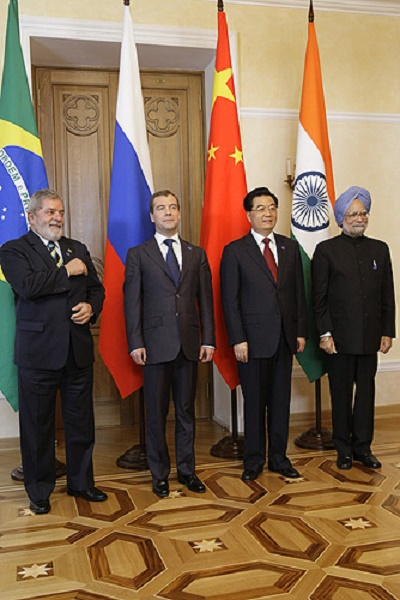
Leaders at the 1st BRIC summit. From left are: President Luiz Inácio Lula da Silva of Brazil; President Dmitry Medvedev of Russia; Paramount leader Hu Jintao of China, and Prime Minister Manmohan Singh of India.

The heads of state and heads of government of the four countries participated.

**Core BRIC members** Host state and leader are shown in bold text.
Member		Represented by	Title
(Brazil)	Brazil	Luiz Inácio Lula da Silva	President
(Russia)	**Russia**	**Dmitry Medvedev**	**President**
(India)	India	Manmohan Singh	Prime Minister
(China)	China	Hu Jintao	General Secretary; President

== Gallery of participating leaders ==
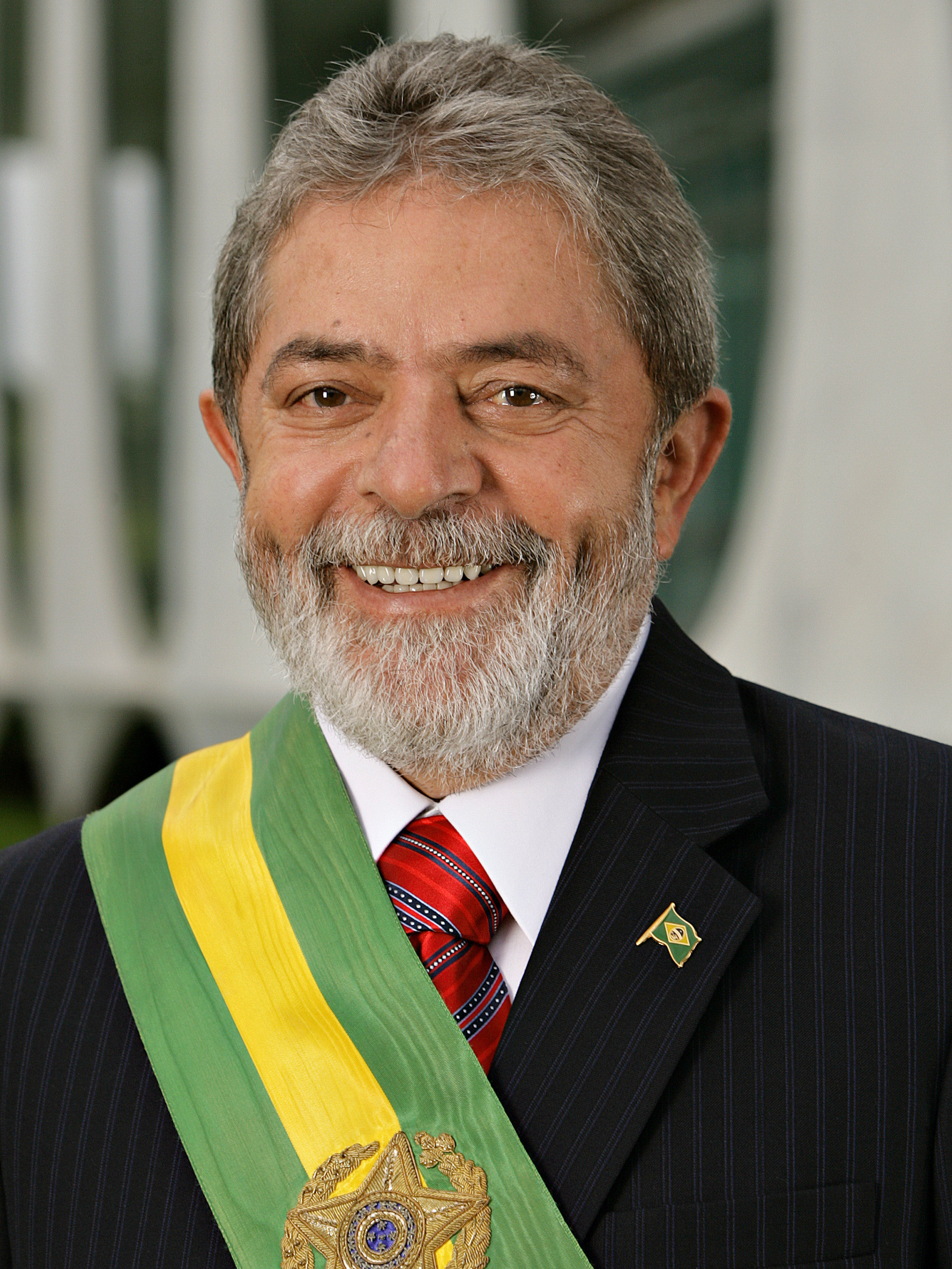
(Brazil) **Brazil**
Lula da Silva, President

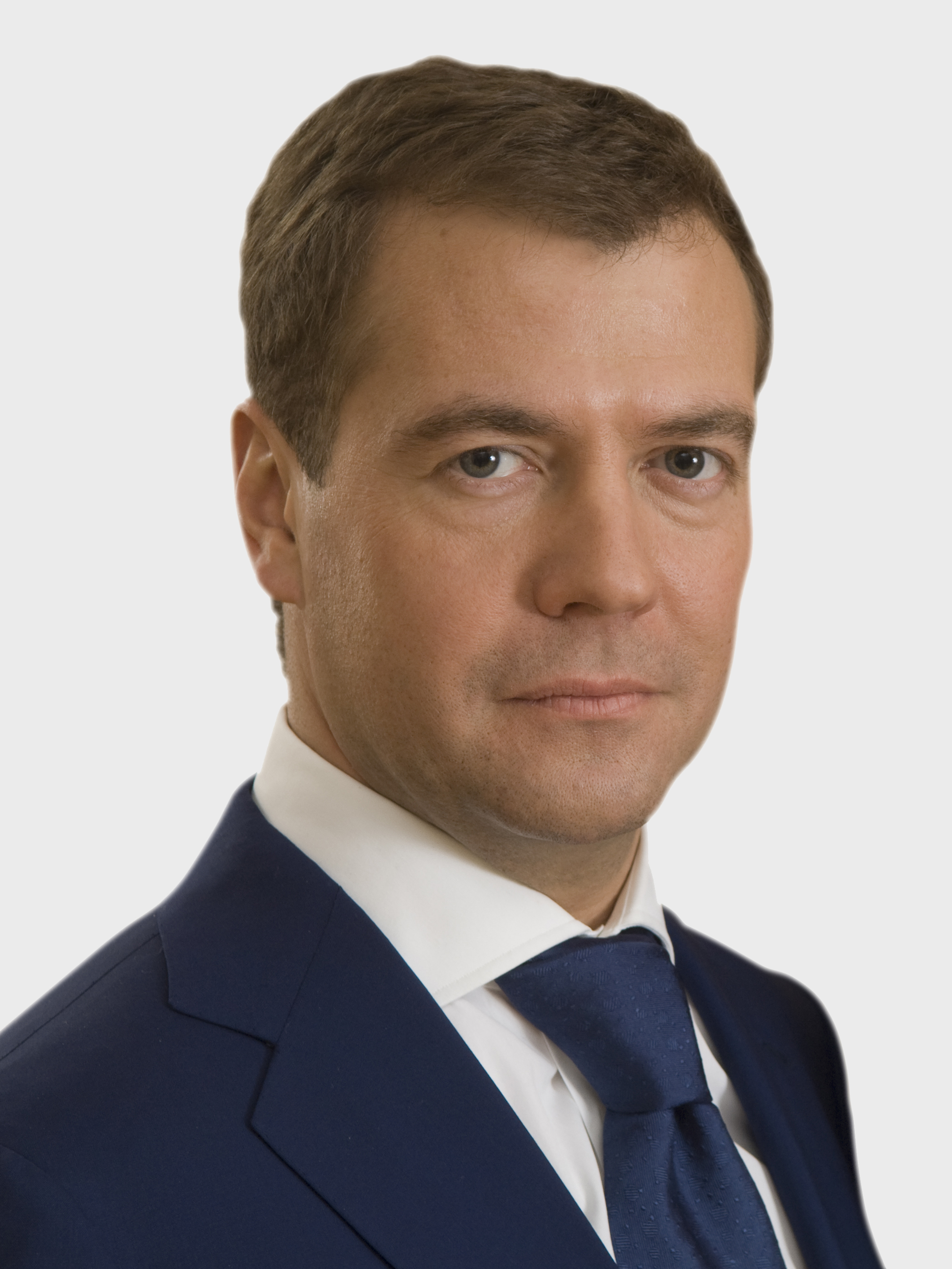
(Russia) **Russia**
**Dmitry Medvedev, President (Host)**

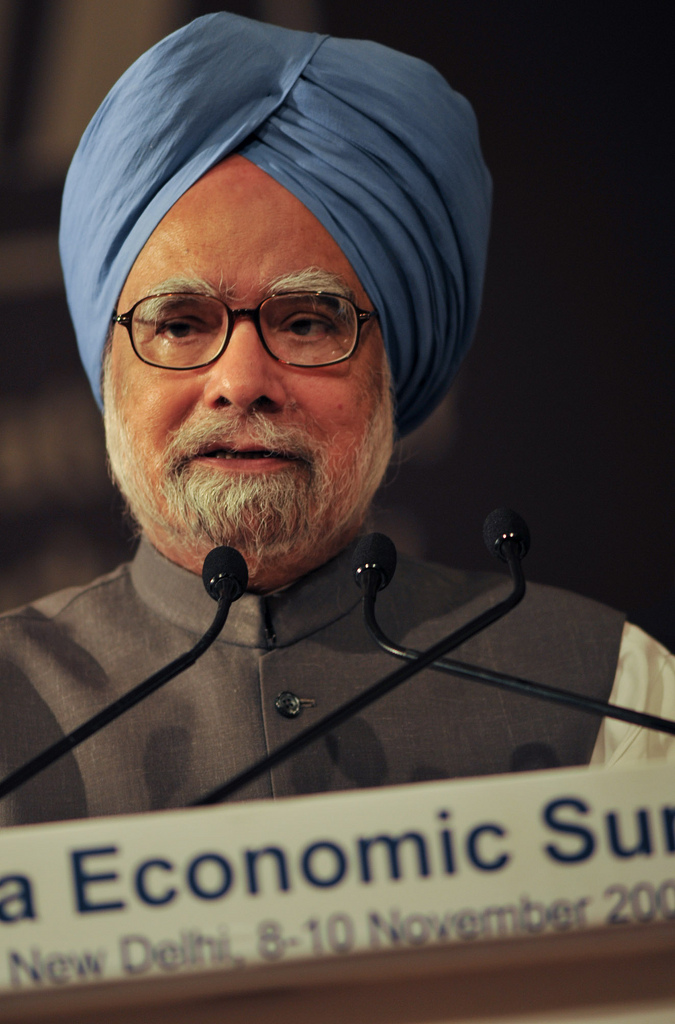
(India) **India**
Manmohan Singh, Prime Minister

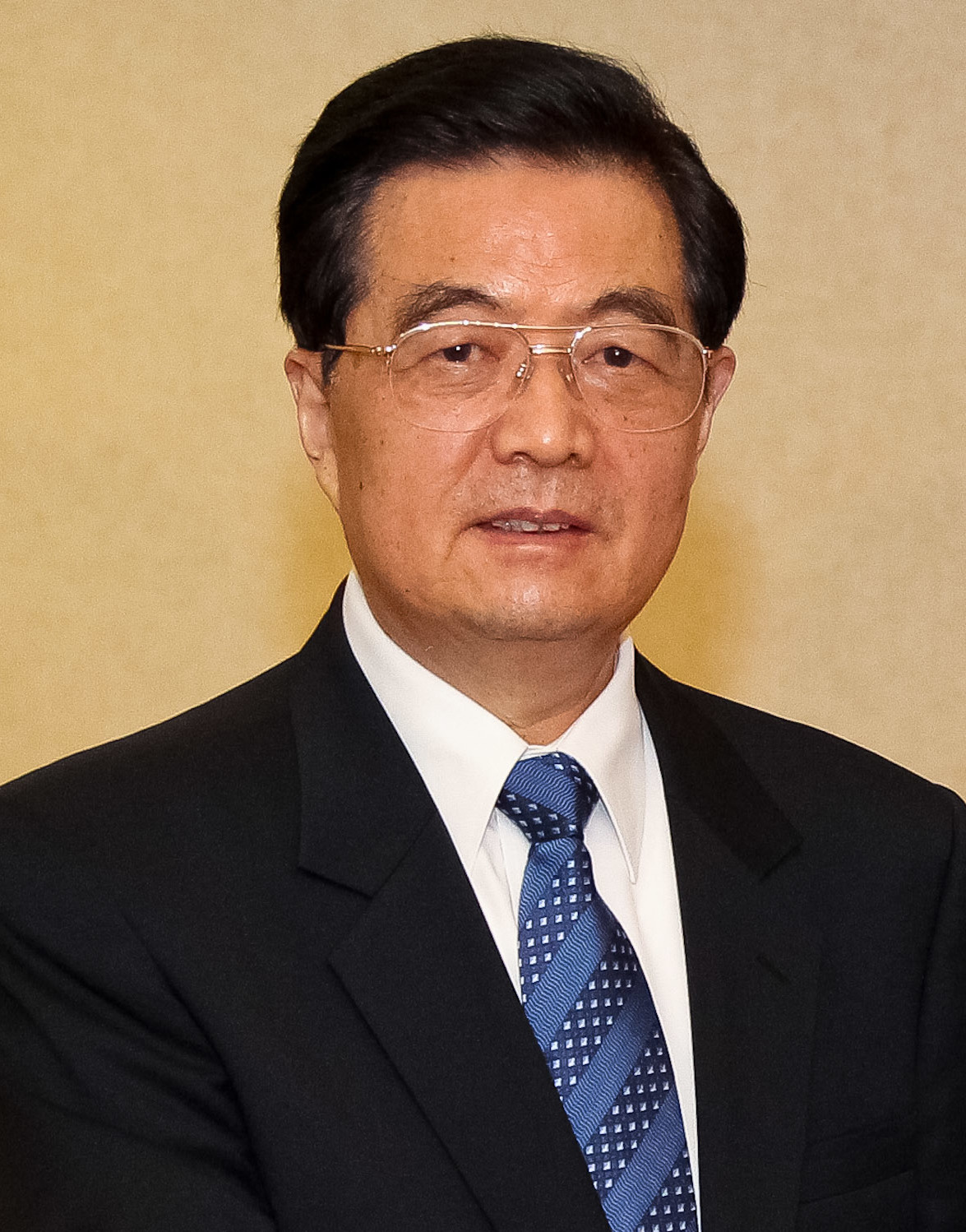
(China) **China**
Hu Jintao, CCP General Secretary and President

== Issues ==
The leaders discussed the 2008 financial crisis, global development, and further strengthening of the BRIC group.

=== World economy ===
The BRIC leaders called for increased economic reform, demanding a "greater voice and representation in international financial institutions, and their heads and senior leadership should be appointed through an open, transparent and merit-based selection process."

They urged the international community to push for comprehensive results of the Doha Round.

=== Political issues ===
Amongst the important issues discussed were United Nations reform. "We reiterate the importance we attach to the status of India and Brazil in international affairs, and understand and support their aspirations to play a greater role in the United Nations."

=== Food crisis ===
Regarding the 2007–2008 world food price crisis, the leaders issued a joint statement on global food security, calling for "action by all governments and the relevant international agencies"; and reaffirmed "their commitment to contribute to the efforts to overcome the global food crisis".
