= CLMV =

Cambodia, Laos, Myanmar, and Vietnam

The CLMV countries is a country association within the Association of Southeast Asian Nations (ASEAN) consisting of Cambodia, Laos, Myanmar, and Vietnam. The association comprises some of its newest, lowest-income, and formerly closed-economy members.

All four of the CLMV countries joined ASEAN in the late 1990s, and were the newest members of the bloc until the admission of Timor-Leste in 2025.

== Cooperation within the CLMV bloc ==
The CLMV association has hosed annual Economic Ministers' Meetings and summits since 2010, and produces annual work plans for economic and political cooperation.

The "Four Countries, One Destination" tourism campaign was launched in 2025 to provide for intergovernmental cooperation in supporting land tourism from and between the four countries.

== Economy and trade ==
The CLMV region has seen significant investment from external countries, particularly Japan (as part of its Greater Mekong Subregion investment strategy), Thailand, and China.

From 2015 to 2019, CLMV countries outpaced the rest of ASEAN in economic growth, with an average of 6% GDP growth rate per year compared to the rest of the bloc's 4.6%. However, the bloc has had uneven economic growth in total, with Vietnam's 2023 GDP per capita being more than double that of next-highest member Laos, and closer to the Philippines and Indonesia.

A 2018 study from the University of the Thai Chamber of Commerce showed that CLMV countries had higher trade with China than with the rest of ASEAN combined. CLMV countries accounted for 10.4% of Thailand's total exports in 2016, more than double the figure from 2010.
