= 3G countries =

List of countries with a high potential for growth

3G Countries
- Type: Growth potential economies
- Members: 11 countries: Bangladesh; China; Egypt; India; Indonesia; Iraq; Mongolia; Nigeria; Philippines; Sri Lanka; Vietnam

3G (Global Growth Generating) countries are 11 countries which have been identified as sources of growth potential and of profitable investment opportunities.

== Background ==
Prepared in February 2011, a Citigroup report prepared by analysts Willem Buiter (Chief Economist) and Ebrahim Rahbari claimed that BRICS (Brazil, Russia, India, and China, plus South Africa) countries have "outlived their usefulness". "We hold the view that categories emerging markets, advanced economies, developing countries, BRICS, Next Eleven or the Growth Markets are all labels belonging to classification schemes that either have outlived their usefulness or are unlikely to ever have any," the two analysts said. So, long run continues growths are important, although some of the eleven countries identified are poor today and have decades of catch-up growth to look forward to.

The grouping based on a weighted average of six growth drivers:

- Domestic saving/investment
- Demographic prospects
- Health
- Education
- Quality of institutions and policies
- Trade openness

== 3G Index score ==
Global Growth Generators (3G) countries 2010–2050
Country	GDP/capita (2018)	GDP/capita (US$; %)	Growth (Avg. %)	3G Index
Bangladesh	$4,561	4	6.3	0.39
China	$18,066	16	5.0	0.81
Egypt	$13,526	13	5.0	0.37
India	$7,783	7	7.1	0.71
Indonesia	$13,121	10	5.6	0.70
Iraq	$17,429	8	6.1	0.58
Mongolia	$12,989	8	6.3	0.63
Nigeria	$6,059	5	6.9	0.25
Philippines	$8,859	8	5.5	0.60
Sri Lanka	$13,777	11	5.9	0.33
Vietnam	$7,378	7	6.4	0.86

Note: China and India highlighted in gold with bold text as also BRIC countries. Bigger index means better conditions. GDP per capita measured at 2018 PPP USD. Average growth is average growth in forecast of real GDP per capita measured at 2018 PPP USD.

== 3G countries ==
The most promising growth prospects countries are Vietnam, Bangladesh, China, Egypt, India, Indonesia, Iraq, Mongolia, Nigeria, Philippines, and Sri Lanka. China,Indonesia and India as BRICS countries are 3G countries, but not for Brazil,South Africa and Russia. Developing Asia and Africa will be fastest growing regions until 2050, driven by population and income growth, so all 3G countries came from two continents (Asia with nine countries and Africa with two) and none came from the other continents. Vietnam has the highest Global Growth Generators Index among the 11 major economies, and China is second with 0.81, followed by India's 0.71. This holds Vietnam as the world's highest potential source of high growth and profitable investment opportunities.

As of October 2011, based on a report from the HSBC Trade Confidence Index (TCI) and HSBC Trade Forecast there are four countries with significant trade volume growth, i.e. Egypt, India, Vietnam and Indonesia with growth expected at least 7.3 percent per year until 2025.
