= Power projection =

Capacity of a state to deploy and sustain military forces outside its territory

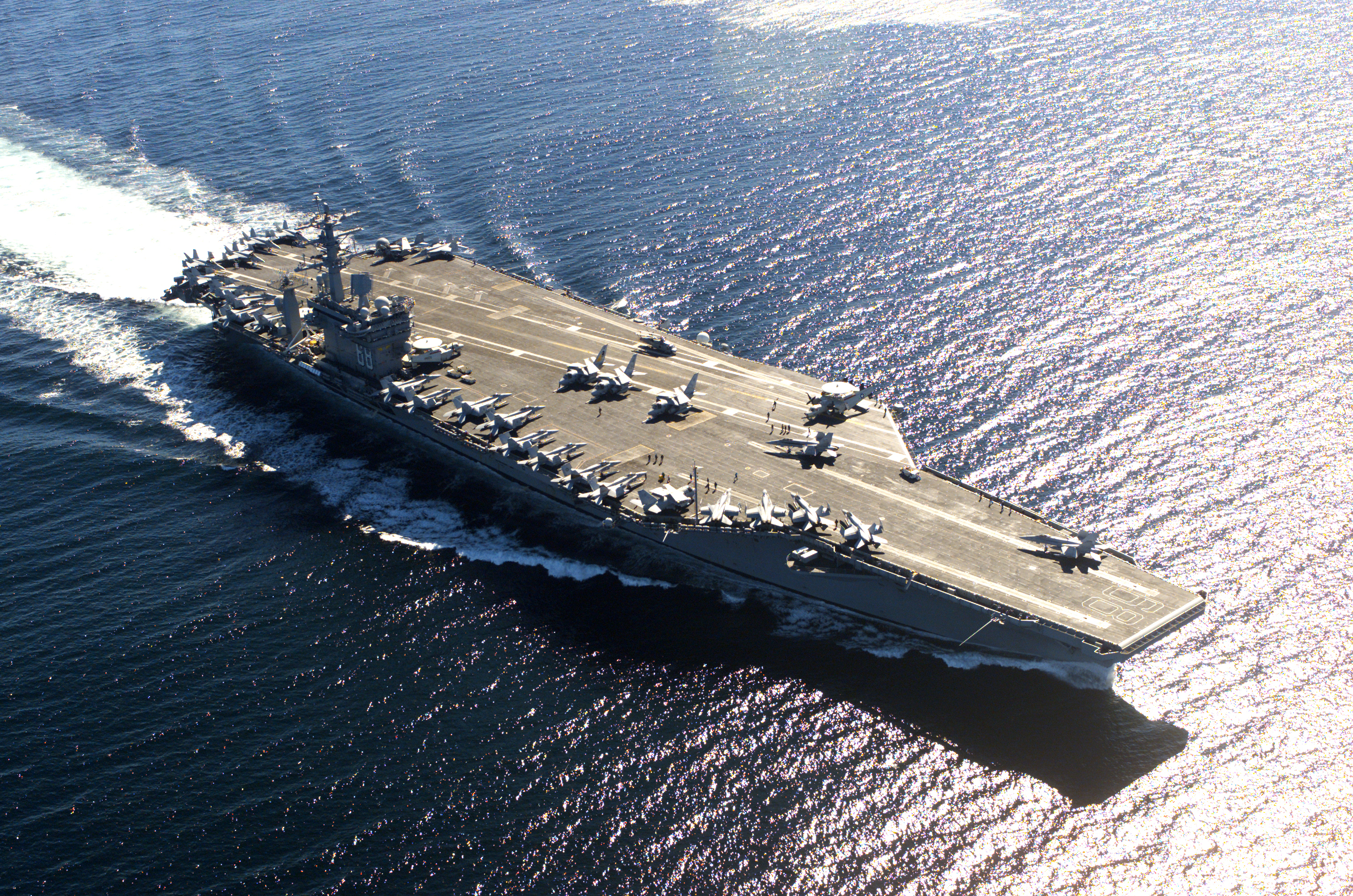
Aircraft carriers such as the USS Nimitz play an important role in modern power projection.

Power projection (or force projection or strength projection) in international relations is the capacity of a state to deploy and sustain forces outside its territory. The ability of a state to project its power into an area may serve as an effective diplomatic lever, influencing the decision-making processes and acting as a potential deterrent on other states' behavior.

This ability is a crucial element of a state's power in international relations. Any state able to direct its military forces outside its territory might be said to have some level of power projection capability, but the term itself is used most frequently in reference to militaries with a worldwide reach (or at least significantly broader than a state's immediate area). Even states with sizable hard power assets (such as a large standing army) may only be able to exert limited regional influence so long as they lack the means of effectively projecting their power on a global scale. Generally, only a select few states are able to overcome the logistical difficulties inherent in the deployment and direction of a modern, mechanized military force. Allies and partners can take up or share some of the burden of power projection. One measure of the capability of a state to project power is the loss-of-strength gradient, until a culminating point is apparent to others, once an operation is underway.

A state might § compete in the gray zone just short of conflict, exercising its soft power, or hard power, in a bid for potential superpower. (Note: In the view of Larry Fink, the 2022 Russian invasion of Ukraine, the COVID-19 pandemic, and the disruption of their supply chains show that companies and governments in regional blocs will have "to reevaluate their dependencies and reanalyze their manufacturing and assembly footprints".) While traditional measures of power projection typically focus on hard power assets (tanks, soldiers, aircraft, naval vessels, etc.), the use of soft power shows that power projection does not necessarily have to actively put military forces in combat, but only potentially. Assets for power projection can often serve dual uses, as the deployment of various countries' militaries during the humanitarian response to the 2004 Indian Ocean earthquake illustrates.

== History ==
Early examples of power projection include Roman dominance of Europe and the wider Mediterranean basin: the ability to project power is tied to the ability to innovate and field such innovations. Roman engineering innovations such as machines (pile driver), concrete, aqueducts and modern roads provided the footing for an economic engine that powered a military that was unmatched in its day. Examples of Roman power projection include Julius Caesar constructing the Rhine bridge in 10 days to demonstrate the ability to march his 40,000 troops as he saw fit: the local inhabitants enjoyed the natural protection of the river and fled when this natural protection was overcome. Although Rome is far from the center of modern power, its influence can be seen in the architecture of modern capitols around the world (domes, arches, columns). The demonstration of an extraordinary innovative military capability will signal power and, when properly applied, terminate conflicts summarily.

During the Ming treasure voyages in the 15th century, the Chinese treasure fleet was heavily militarized to exercise power projection around the Indian Ocean and thereby promote its interests.

The modern ability to project power and exert influence on a global scale can be tied to innovations stemming from the Industrial Revolution and the associated modernizations in technology, communications, finance and bureaucracy; this finally allowed the state to create unprecedented amounts of wealth and to effectively marshal these resources to exert power over long distances.

As the birthplace of the Industrial Revolution, Britain was the first to utilize its industrial-technological power advantage to dominate rivals and greatly expand its global Empire throughout the 19th century. As a maritime power, the Royal Navy played a central role in providing Britain the strength and ability to dominate world trade and project power globally to further its interests. A worldwide system of naval bases and coaling stations, a large logistical bureaucracy to oversee shipbuilding, the supply of coal, food, water, and sailors, and an industrial base for the manufacture and technological enhancement of the fleet were among the essential ingredients for this capability. During the First Opium War (1839–1842), it was this capacity that enabled a British expeditionary force of 15 barracks ships, 4 steam-powered gunboats and 25 smaller boats with 4,000 marines to successfully defend its interests 6,000 miles (9,700 km) from the fleet's home port.

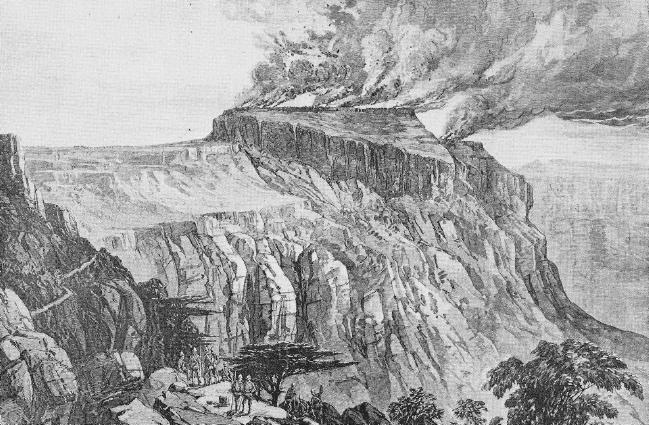
An illustration of the burning of Magdala, an event which took place during the British Expedition to Abyssinia in 1868. The expedition came about as a result of Tewodros II of Ethiopia's imprisonment of European missionaries and officials, and demonstrated the power projection capabilities of the British Empire.

The Anglo-French expeditionary force sent to shore up the Ottoman Empire against Russian aggression during the Crimean War (1853–1856) was one of the earliest modern examples of a planned expeditionary power-projection campaign. It was the first campaign to use modern technology, including steam-powered warships and telegraph communications.

Another illustrative example of industrial power projection, was the British Expedition to Abyssinia in 1868 as a retaliation against Emperor Tewodros II of Ethiopia's imprisonment of several missionaries and British government representatives. The expeditionary force sent was a tremendous logistical and technological challenge at the time. Commanded by Lieutenant-General Sir Robert Napier of the Bombay Army, military intelligence was used to estimate the required size of the army and the difficulties of traversing the inhospitable terrain.

A force of over 30,000 was shipped from British India to Zula on the Red Sea on a fleet of more than 280 steam ships, while an advance detachment of engineers built a large port with two piers, warehouses and a lighthouse, and constructed a 20-mile (32 km)-long railway towards the interior. A road was also built for the artillery to be moved along with the help of elephants. After three months of trekking, the British force repelled an Ethiopian attack and launched an artillery bombardment against the fortress of Magdala which led to its capitulation; Tewodros committed suicide.

In the Russo-Japanese War of 1904–1905, the Japanese destruction of the Imperial Russian Navy's Pacific Fleet demonstrated Imperial Russia's inability to project force in the East. This immediately diminished Russia's diplomatic sway in that region. At the same time, Russia's western armies became less credible, as mobilization exposed organizational flaws and threw the western armies into chaos. This led analysts in Europe, such as German chief of staff Count Alfred von Schlieffen, to conclude that Russia would prove inept at projecting force in Europe, thus demoting Russia in European diplomatic relations.

Many other actions can be considered projections of force. The 19th century is full of incidents such as the 1864 Shimonoseki campaign and the Boxer Rebellion. More recently, the Falklands War provided an example of the United Kingdom's ability to project force far from home. Other recent examples of power projection include the U.S.-led invasion of Iraq and the NATO bombing of Yugoslavia. The ability of the U.S. Navy, the British Royal Navy, and the French Navy to deploy large numbers of ships for long periods of time away from home are notable projection abilities. See § Power projection capabilities.

The globalization of power projection was long avoided in the research with the subject of globalization mostly channeled to economic field, but in 2018 Historian Max Ostrovsky broke the path. In prehistory, he wrote, power was not projected behind entrance of a cave. In history, empires and colonies projected power ever farther, creating world system c. 1900. World Wars were expressions of power projected on global scale.

The potential of power projection can be estimated mathematically by calculating the speed of transportation and communication relatively to the extent of contemporary power projection. Roman troops moved 50 km per day; today Globemasters move troops 20,000 km per day. The speed of communication in the largest Empire in Americas (Inca) was 20 km per hour (running man); today it moves with the speed of light. Multiplying the range of power projection in those empires by increase in the speed of transportation or communication, Ostrovsky estimated the present power projection potential to exceed the size of Earth multiple times.

== Elements ==
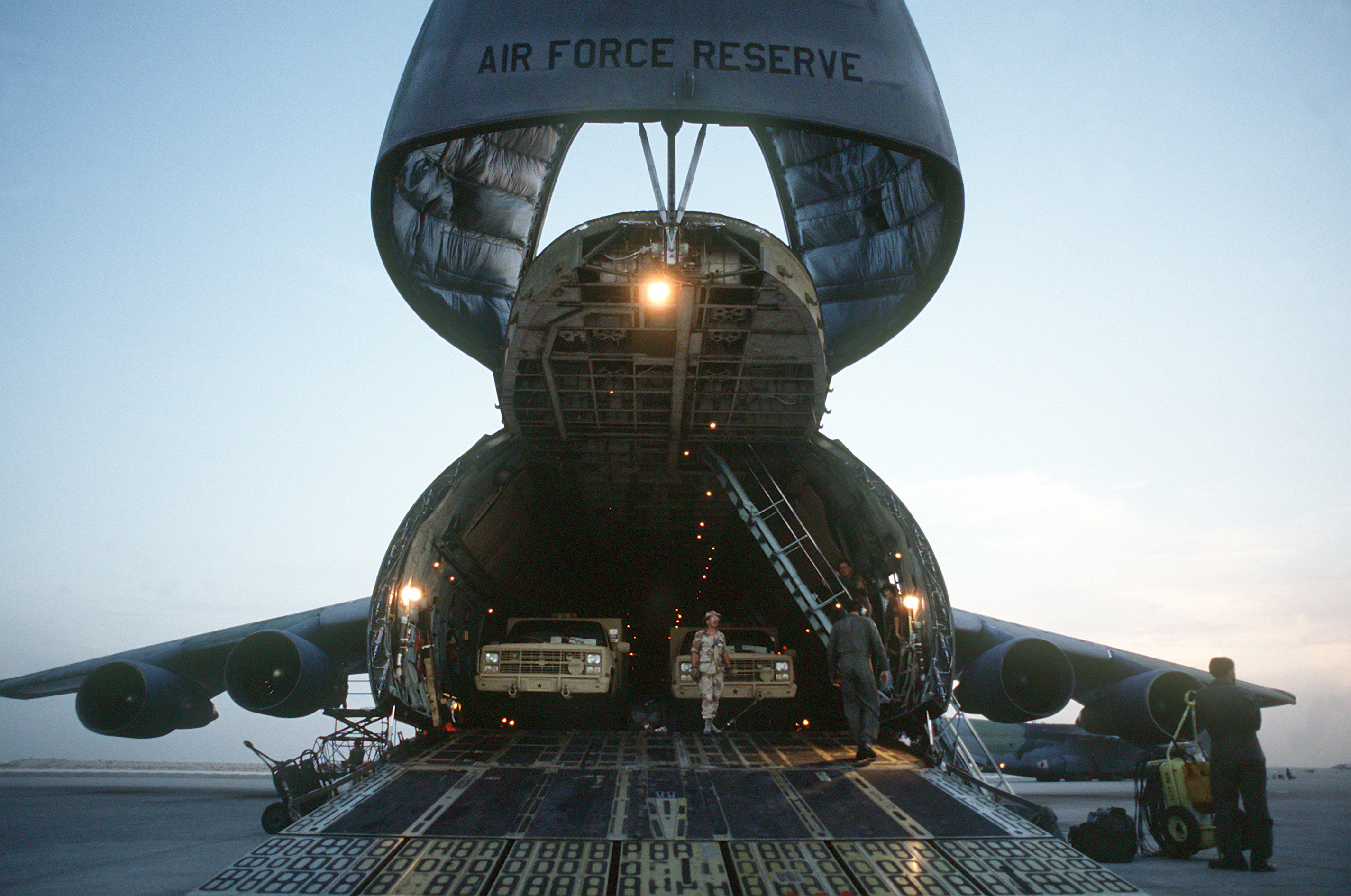
The cargo hold intercontinental flight capabilities of the C-5 Galaxy make it a major asset for deploying military equipment around the globe.

The U.S. Department of Defense defines power projection as the "ability of a nation to apply all or some of its elements of national power—political, economic, informational, or military—to rapidly and effectively deploy and sustain forces in and from multiple dispersed locations to respond to crises, to contribute to deterrence, and to enhance regional stability".

As distance between a fighting force and its headquarters increases, command and control inevitably becomes more difficult. Modern-day power projection often employs high-tech communications and information technology to overcome these difficulties, a process sometimes described as the "Revolution in Military Affairs".

While a few long-range weapons such as the intercontinental ballistic missiles (ICBMs) and some unmanned combat aerial vehicles (drones) are capable of projecting deadly force in their own right, it is military logistics that is at the heart of power projection. The ability to integrate naval and air forces with land armies as part of joint warfare is a key aspect of effective power projection; airlift and sealift capabilities facilitate the deployment of soldiers and weapons to a distant theater of war.

The aircraft carrier strike group, strategic bomber, ballistic missile submarine, and strategic airlifter are all examples of power projection platforms. Military units designed to be light and mobile, such as airborne forces (paratroopers and air assault forces) and amphibious assault forces, are utilized in power projection. Forward basing is another method of power projection, which, by pre-positioning military units or stockpiles of arms at strategically located military bases outside a country's territory, reduces the time and distance needed to mobilize them.

== Types ==
Scholars have disaggregated military power projection into nine different categories based on political goals and level of force. Four of these employ "soft" military power (securing sea lanes of communication, non-combatant evacuation, humanitarian response, and peacekeeping) and the rest are primarily concerned with "hard" military power (show the flag, compellence/deterrence, punishment, armed intervention, and conquest). There is a § continuum in these capabilities.

=== Soft power ===
Examples of soft power projection include:

- Securing sea lanes of communication: the protection of shipping lanes from attack by hostile states or irregular threats.
- Non-combatant evacuation operations: the evacuation of citizens or friendly third-country civilians from a foreign country when they are endangered by war or civil unrest.
- Humanitarian response: the use of military forces abroad to assist in the aftermath of a natural disaster.
- Peacekeeping: military operations designed to support diplomatic efforts to reach a long-term political settlement to an ongoing dispute.
- Establishing trust, as the basis of cooperation among allies and partners

=== Gray zone competition ===
This section has been split from US Army Futures Command § Other armies

The gray zone between cooperation and conflict has expanded due to the competition in power projection capabilities of the world's armies, as well as in the competition for economic power among the world's nations.

The US, Russia, China, Britain, and France have renounced the use of nuclear weapons in 2022. However, in the face of threats of nuclear war (say from Russia, as threatened during the 2022 Russian invasion of Ukraine), (Note: When asked about countering tactical nuclear weapons which Russia might possibly use against Ukraine, Mark Esper the US' 27th secretary of defense suggested that US and NATO allies agree to put an 'air cap' over Ukraine, to counter any Russian aircraft capable of delivering a tactical nuclear bomb (most likely a 1-10 kTon gravity bomb, or via Iskander cruise missile), and to warn Russia not to fly such an aircraft at Ukraine.) NATO keeps about 100 B61 nuclear bombs in storage in Europe. Certain F-35As were certified to carry the B61 nuclear bomb on 12 October 2023.

The British Army is investigating innovations, such as robots and drones, including 70 technologies funded by the £800 million (US$1 billion) Defence Innovation Fund launched in 2016. Two hundred troops will engage in "surveillance, long-range, and precision targeting, enhanced mobility and the re-supply of forces, urban warfare and enhanced situational awareness". The British Army is reducing size by about 10,000 troops as well, by 2025. The British Army will have Integrated Operating Concept (MDI—like MDO) for "gray zone" operations across domains, using a synthetic operating environment, with repeatable hard and soft strike capability. The UK, Germany, and France respectively have established a joint command for space United Kingdom Space Command, a Space Situational Awareness Centre (Germany), and Commandement de l’espace (France). In light of the 2022 Russian Invasion of Ukraine NATO members are implementing new stockpile guidelines for their arsenals. "By 2020 the Army's programs for modernization were now framed as a decades-long process of cooperation with allies and partners, for competition with potential adversaries who historically have blurred the distinction between peace and war"—from: § Reorganization plan of the United States Army

1. In 2020, one measure of § military power projection ranks the competition between the armies of the world (after the US Army, which is ranked atop this list). (Note: The US Army's unclassified Multi-Domain Operations (MDO) concept is "the combined arms employment of capabilities from all domains that create and exploit relative advantages to defeat enemy forces, achieve objectives and consolidate gains during competition, crisis, and armed conflict".) The list of armies, a mixture of allies, partners, and competitors is estimated to be:
2. Russia jammed the GPS signal during NATO exercises in November 2018. (Note: "All types of Russian precision munitions are seeing high failure rates". Connectivity to GLONASS is a factor in the lack of Russian PGM availability, and the use of 3G/4G cell towers for Russian encrypted communications (Era) at the beginning of the 2022 Russian invasion of Ukraine. "On February 24, 2022 between 5 and 9 AM, just as Russian forces were starting their missile attacks, hackers targeted satellite modems that communicate with Viasat's KA-SAT". This weakness was unearthed during the use of open communication ("Russian commanders are sometimes piggybacking on Ukrainian cell phone networks to communicate") when FSB was discussing the deaths of their generals: Vitaly Gerasimov, killed 7 Mar 2022; Andrei Sukhovetsky, killed 28 Feb 2022.) In 2014 the DoD's research and engineering chief Alan Shaffer warned that the 'US lost dominance of the electromagnetic spectrum' (EMS), in part due to the US government selloff of EMS radio frequencies, and also due in part to the proliferation of digital technologies which allow for low-cost jammers. (See: meaconing) General Valery Gerasimov advocates hybrid warfare, a "blend of political, economic and military power to bear against adversaries". Russia took Crimea without firing a shot. (Note: In light of the 2022 Russian invasion of Ukraine which began 24 February 2022, earlier assumptions of the truth of public statements about the situation up to that time were reassessed. The speed of the logistical response of the partners in the NATO alliance when funnelling aid like Bayraktar TB2s to Ukraine is instructive. By 7 April 2022, "the U.S. and allies have provided [Ukraine] 60,000 anti-tank weapons and 25,000 anti-aircraft weapons"—Gen. Mark Milley. By 31 October 2022, the 2022 Russian invasion of Ukraine had slowed due to the rainy season.) In April 2020 Russia tested an anti-satellite system for low Earth orbit (LEO) satellites. On 15 November 2021, a Russian anti-satellite test destroyed its Kosmos 1408, endangering its own cosmonauts on the International Space Station, and other satellites in low Earth orbit. Cyber attacks on the whole of the US government via Supply_chain_attack § Whole of government began in March 2020, but only reached the attention of the news media on 14 December 2020. Russia is mapping the undersea cables which bear the majority of the communications traffic between the US and Europe.
  - On 25 December 2021 President Putin disclosed that Russia would be unable to defend itself against missiles launched against Moscow from Ukraine; their flight times would be four to five minutes, according to him. However, Putin did not acknowledge that the West's Aegis Ashore sites in Poland and Romania are for defense against ballistic missiles, and not the Tomahawk missiles which he named in his statement. See: A-135 anti-ballistic missile system, A-235 anti-ballistic missile system, S-400 missile system, S-500 missile system To prove that Aegis Ashore is defensive only, inspection of the sites in Poland and Romania have been offered to Russia.
  - 2014 map of line separating Ukrainian and Russian-backed forces
    Ukraine had a trench network on its border with Russia, in a standoff as of April 2021. A border exercise involving 110,000 Russian troops on the Ukraine border has pulled back; however hundreds of armored vehicles, including tanks are remaining 100 miles (160 km) from Donbas (colloquial for Donets basin) in spite of a partial armor pullback. Organization for Security and Cooperation in Europe (OCSE) drones which are monitoring the line between Ukrainian troops and the Donbas separatists are seeing jamming of their drone's dual GPS receivers, with tens of thousands of infantry troops remaining on the Ukrainian border. The OSCE has provided a map of the line dividing the Ukrainian forces and the Russian-backed forces. As of 18 February 2022 there were up to 190,000 troops along Ukraine's borders; after recognizing the separatist states of the Donetsk and Luhansk People's Republics, Moscow is moving troops over the border of Russia into the Donetsk and Luhansk areas, and establishing military bases there. This troop movement triggered sanctions on five Russian banks and three individuals, on 22 February 2022. (See 2022 Russian invasion of Ukraine which began 24 February 2022)
    - Andrei Illarionov cites Pavel Felgengauer, who projects a scenario by which Russia can create a 'Novorossia' (see § CSIS figures 2a-2c) stretching across Southern Ukraine to Transnistria (Moldova) after a gas pipeline to the EU is completed (September 2021). If the Nord Stream 2 gas pipeline were to be weaponized by holding the liquefied natural gas (LNG) supply to Western Europe hostage, the US is countering this threat with contingency plans to redirect LNG supplies from the rest of the world. Germany has agreed to safeguard Ukraine, as well. (Note: In 2022 Russia's actions against Ukraine alerted 'the West' (that is, Europe, and its NATO partners) to the threat to Europe's food and energy supply. After the 2008 war in Georgia, and the 2014 takeover of Crimea and Donbas in Ukraine, a political takeover of Ukraine is a likely objective of Russian leadership.) See 2022 Nord Stream pipeline sabotage —26 September 2022
    - Cyber attacks on Ukrainian government websites are occurring in January 2022. Frida Ghitis and Richard Galant point out that the muddy season that ends winter would bog down an armored invasion. US Army Lieutenant Colonel Alex Vershinen points out that if the Russian Army were to attempt a quick fait accompli and then dig in, its logistical capability would be insufficient to complete a large land grab, as its logistic capabilities are largely based on railroads, but not trucks. Russia's logistic capability without railroads is 90 miles (140 km), without replenishment; thus Sebastien Roblin suggests that a "short, victorious war" by Russia (as in the 12-day war with Georgia in 2008), with stipulations largely resembling its current diplomatic demands, namely installation of pro-Russian leadership, Ukraine's withdrawal from the path of joining NATO etc., coupled with the expedient of bypassing Russian control of Kyiv's population, might avoid Russia's getting bogged down in Ukraine. This calculation could get up-ended by a longer war, (Note: Russia's invasion was countered by $100 billion in logistical aid to Ukraine, Feb-Dec 2022; however the aid is becoming constrained by the capacity of the US's industrial base to surge production. The invasion is causing materiel shortages in Russia. The surge in aid to Ukraine is causing NATO to acquire more interoperable materiel from a global industrial base, for more integrated deterrence across the NATO alliance against its adversaries.) with determined resistance in Ukraine, via guerilla warfare, as in Afghanistan (1979-1989), which indirectly ended the Soviet Union. Within two months of the beginning of the First Chechen War, an antiwar movement arose in Russia.
      - On 22 February 2022 historian Sergey Radchenko recalled a vignette from September 1945, during the post World War II Potsdam Conference negotiations on the division of world power at the London Conference of Foreign Ministers, when Soviet Foreign Commissar Vyacheslav Molotov asked U.S. Secretary of State James F. Byrnes whether he carried the atomic bomb in his side pocket, to which Byrnes threatened Molotov to stop stalling, or else Byrnes would pull the atomic bomb out of his pocket and use it on Molotov (laughter). Molotov was guided by Stalin's directive "It is clear that you must display complete obduracy". (See Proxy war)
  - Russia and Belarus began Zapad 2021, a 200,000-troop exercise held every four years. The Pripyat marshes would bog down an armored invasion through Belarus.
  - In the opinion of James Stavridis, the 2022 Russian invasion of Ukraine is showing that Special Forces, unmanned systems, and Cyber will become far more important in the future.
  - In 2021 Russia spent 2.7 percent of its GDP on defense, a level which is expected to drop to 2.3 percent by 2023, as part of a mandate to boost domestic production.
    - Unmanned ground combat vehicles (UGCVs), among them Uran-6, Uran-9 (Уран-9), and Uran-14 are entering service in the Russian Army as of 2021. Uran-6 is a mine flail; Uran-14 is an unmanned firefighting vehicle. Uran-9s are semi-autonomous robotic combat vehicles; specialists can operate them using mobile control stations. Their first attempted service was in Syria. Analysts from BAE Systems (UK) assessed the Uran-9s in Syria as unreliable, with their radio-controls sometimes blocked by buildings; their sensors and guidance were unstabilized. An armed Uran-9 weighs 12 tons, and measures 5 meters long, which is a fifth of the weight and half the length of a T-90 tank. Each Uran-9 control system operates at ranges up to 1.8 miles (2.9 km) from the UGVs; each control system currently (2021) guides 4 UGVs, in a leader-follower configuration. Uran-9 was used in the Vostok 2018 exercises in 2018. At least 20 Uran-9 UGCVs exist.
    - Russia's defense ministry has signed a contract to field the Tsirkon hypersonic missiles to its troops in 2025.
    - During the 2021 negotiations for defusing the Ukraine-Russia confrontation, Deputy Foreign Minister Sergei Ryabkov has warned that its 9M729 nuclear-capable cruise missile, which is already deployed in the European part of Russia, might be further employed there.
    - The hypersonic Kh-47M2 Kinzhal, and 3M22 Zircon (Tsirkon) are standoff strike weapons, for keeping adversaries at bay; they are land-based, and sea-based respectively.
  - On 1 September 2022 Russia, China, India, and 11 other nations began a scaled-down Vostok 2022 (East 2022). Vostok will exercise 50,000 troops, down from 300,000 in 2018. India is contributing 75 troops.
  - By 19 October 2022 NATO nations were providing winter equipment to Ukraine. By Spring 2023 the US industrial base can be providing 20,000 rounds of 155mm howitzer munitions per month to Ukraine.
  - Beginning 1 April 2023 400,000 contract servicemen are to replenish the Russian army.
  - In a meeting in Moscow, March 2023 the leaders of China and Russia agreed to cooperate over a wide range of business, and economic issues, such as payment in local currencies (viz., Yuan or Rubles).
3. China—RAND simulations show Blue losses. Six of the top 15 defense companies in the world are now Chinese, in 2019 for the first time. The competition with China was shaped in the decade 2010–2020, according to David Kriete. By 2023 China's defense companies were offering competitors to US Javelins, armed drones, and supersonic cruise missiles.
  - Secretary Mark Esper said that China is aiming to be the dominant military power in Asia by 2049. The 14th five-year plan (2021-2025) of China's ruling party, aims to accelerate the army's modernization and informationization, in order to improve national security for 2027 (100th anniversary of its ruling party), according to Dean Cheng. By 2023 China's working-age demographic (a shrinking labor force/ capital savings rate) will start to work against the Party's aspiration for 2027, (Note: During the DoD secretary's review of the 7th monthly meeting of the Ukraine Defense Contact Group, Gen. Mark Milley was pressed for an assessment of the CCP's readiness for war; Gen. Milley reminded the press that the PLA had not fought a war since 1979; that China's GDP was being harvested for materiel, and that the US military would remain atop the world's armies as long as the US GDP remained strong.: On 7 December 2022 "Gen. Mark A. Milley, the chairman of the Joint Chiefs of Staff, and Royal Navy Adm. Sir Tony Radakin, the United Kingdom's chief of defense staff, said the Russian leader has continued to make calamitous mistakes in Russia's war on Ukraine"; when asked "might the invasion of Ukraine embolden China to invade Taiwan"? —Radakin rejected the premise, and Milley reiterated "[The US] is the number one military in the world, and it's the most capable that combined arms maneuver," ... "We're one of the few militaries remaining in the world that can bring it all together in time and space and in all the domains of space, cyber, land, sea and air and undersea. We are very skilled and talented at doing all that. And, and no adversary should underestimate our capabilities".) which, according to General Secretary of the Chinese Communist Party Xi Jinping's plan, is for China's military to reach parity with the US military in 2027. As of June 2023 a diplomatic solution is being sought.
  - The International Federation of Robotics reports that China has been the world leader in implementing industrial robots for the past eight years; in 2020 China used almost half the world's industrial robots.
    - The takeover of a UK semiconductor fab by a Chinese-owned firm has been blocked on national security grounds.
  - In 2017 China adopted the National Intelligence Law which obligates Chinese companies to subordinate themselves to intelligence-gathering measures for the state. China is militarizing the South China Sea. In 2020 a match-up of the Chinese aircraft carrier Liaoning (a rebuilt aircraft cruiser) versus the supercarrier USS Ronald Reagan is assessed to give the Ronald Reagan air superiority within one hour.
  - The 3rd generation GPS network of BeiDou satellites (BDS-3) was completed in July 2020 with the launch of the 30th BDS-3 satellite. The 30th BDS-3 satellite, meant to complete China's own global navigation satellite system, had been previously postponed. See Restrictions on geographic data in China
  - Satellite images of 4 June 2021 reveal an estimated 250 additional missile silos under construction near Yumen, China, warn specialists at the James Martin Center for Nonproliferation Studies. By 2024 China had over 500 nuclear warheads.
  - The Defense Intelligence Agency projects that China will at least double its nuclear arsenal and that its production capability will be far expanded in the 2020s.
  - China controls 80% of world rare earth mineral production, and routinely floods this market when other nations attempt to ramp up their own rare earth production.
    - The tech leaders of China are being enlisted to aid 'Socialism with Chinese characteristics' by pledging part of their wealth to 'common prosperity'. The Cyberspace Administration of China is regulating algorithms on its financial reporting websites which republish foreign financial journalists.
  - Chinese cyber groups are attacking Russia, reports Ben Watson. China is accelerating its timeline to take Taiwan.
  - 149 Chinese fighters and bombers swept over Taiwan's Air Defense Identification Zone (ADIZ) 1–4 October 2021. Taiwan has countered with Civil Air Patrol warnings.
  - China is implementing its plan for 2027: Office of Secretary of Defense (3 Nov 2021) "Military and Security Developments Involving the People's Republic of China", Annual report to Congress China has been reverse-engineering its purchases of Russian materiel, and selling to Russia's defense customers. (Note: Andrew Eversden (17 Dec 2021) Here's the Army's 24 programs in soldiers’ hands by 2023: 1. Precision Strike Missile (§ PrSM); 2. Extended Range Cannon Artillery (ERCA); 3. Long-Range Hypersonic Weapon (§ LRHW); 4. Mid-range capability (§ MRC) missile; 5. Armored Multi-Purpose Vehicle (AMPV); 6. Robotic Combat Vehicle (§ RCV); 7. Mobile Protective Firepower (§ MPF); 8. Future Unmanned Aircraft Systems/ Future Tactical Unmanned Aircraft System (FUAS)/(FTUAS); 9. Integrated Tactical Network (§ ITN) unified with § echelons above brigade, and the multi-domain task forces; 10. Common Operating Environment: Command Post Computing Environment/Mounted Computed Environment (CPCE)/(MCE) See Common operational picture; 11. Command Post Integrated Infrastructure (CPI2); 12. Mounted Assured Positioning, Navigation, and Timing System (MAPS); 13. Dismounted Assured Positioning, Navigation, and Timing System (DAPS); 14. Maneuver-Short Range Air Defense (M-SHORAD) using high-energy lasers; 15. Indirect Fires Protection Capability: Iron Dome; 16. Lower Tier Air and Missile Defense Sensor (§ LTAMDS) - Patriot radar replacement; 17. Army Integrated Air and Missile Defense (§ IBCS); 18. Directed Energy Maneuver-Short Range Air Defense (DE M-SHORAD) High energy lasers; 19. Next Generation Squad Weapon (NGSW); 20. Integrated Visual Augmentation System (IVAS); 21. Enhanced Night Vision Goggle – Binocular (ENVG-B); 22. Reconfigurable Virtual Collective Trainer (RVCT) - Synthetic training environment; 23. IVAS Squad Immersive Virtual Trainer (SiVT) - Synthetic training environment; 24. One World Terrain/ Training Management Tools/ Training Simulation Software (OWT) / (TMT) / (TSS) - Synthetic training environment) (Note: In Future Vertical Lift, FARA and FLRAA are projected to be prototyped by 2028, with fielding by 2030. The OMFV prototype is projected for 2025.)
    - By November 2022 a strict zero-Covid lockdown policy instituted in 2020 had led to 2022 COVID-19 protests in China; China then allowed use of a locally developed mRNA vaccine (2 December 2022), in lieu of lockdowns.
4. India: faces Pakistan; Pakistan can be supplied with Turkey's drones (such as the Bayraktar TB2), which were used with great effect by Azerbaijan against Armenian tanks and Armenian air defense during the 2020 Nagorno-Karabakh war. In 2010 China deployed 11,000 troops in Gilgit, near Kashmir.
  - Japan and India have agreed to enhance their bilateral defense cooperation (9 September 2022).
5. Japan: faces North Korea; Japan has expressed interest in developing its own F-X fighter program; Brian Burton notes that interoperable materiel is needed for allies and partners of the US, and that the US could constructively influence Japan's impending 20-year development effort with lessons learned from UAVs and air defense, for example. On 26 December 2019, at Putin's annual news conference with foreign media, Hirofumi Sugizaki, a Japanese journalist asked about the end of the INF Treaty and the cooperation of Russia and China on an anti-missile system. Putin characterized the anti-missile system as defensive, and the relation of US and Russia as a 'draw' (ヒキワケ—hikiwake). Japan will compensate companies for not disclosing patents with military applications. In a Joint test, Japan's Cooperative Engagement Capability allowed JS Maya to detect and track a ballistic missile; JS Haguro shot it down.

=== Applications of power projection ===
The Texas National Security Review projects five scenarios for the global economy:

1. Reglobalization as in the 1980s
2. Deglobalization away from the trends of the 2000s
3. Globalization with Chinese characteristics
4. Regional blocs with partially closed trading (Note: Peter Zeihan's (16 Mar 2022) prediction over the next few decades: End of globalization, breakdown into regional blocs)
5. Shared strategic interests and common political values, which Friedberg judges will be the choice of the Western bloc and its direction for power projection.

=== Hard power ===
Examples of hard power projection include:

- Showing the flag: the symbolic deployment of military forces to a region for the purposes of demonstrating political interest, resolve, or willingness to take more forceful military action.
- Compulsion/deterrence: the use of the threat of military force against another state to either induce it into or dissuade it from pursuing a given policy. In this form, power projection acts as a diplomatic tool, attempting to influence the decision-making process of foreign actors. See Gray zone competition for context
- Punishment: the punitive use of force against another state in response to their pursuit of a given policy.
- Armed intervention: the movement of military forces into another nation's territory for the purposes of influencing the internal affairs of the target country short of outright conquest.
- Conquest: the offensive use of military assets to forcibly occupy territory controlled or claimed by another state. In 2022 Michael Kofman projected that a Russian invasion of Ukraine would be eastward via Donbas, northward from Crimea, and up the Dnieper river to encircle Ukraine's capital Kyiv, with a political takeover of Ukraine a likely objective of Russian leadership. However, in lieu of a political takeover, a decapitation strike is a possible tactic. Alexander Vindman has projected a path for Ukraine to retake Crimea. By 5 April 2023, Ukraine signalled that it might entertain talks with Russia if the Ukrainian counteroffensive reached the border of Crimea.

== Power projection capabilities ==
Power projection capabilities
Country	Bloc/Group	Maritime force	Helicopter / aircraft carriers active	Overseas bases	Troops deployed in operations abroad	Nuclear deterrence
Australia	G20/MIKTA/FVEY/Commonwealth/APEC/ANZUS/MNNA/QUAD/AUKUS	Green-water navy	2 / 0	1	2900	✗
Argentina	G20/UNASUR/UFC/Mercosur/MNNA/Rio	Green-water navy	0	2	1050	✗
Bangladesh	D-8/BIMSTEC/SAARC/IMCTC/Commonwealth		0	1	6417	✗
Belgium	EU/NATO		0	0	710	Nuclear sharing
Brazil	G20/G4/BRICS/UNASUR/Mercosur/MNNA/Rio	Green-water navy	1 / 0	0	273	✗
Canada	G20/G7/NATO/APEC/FVEY/OIF/Commonwealth/UFC	Green-water navy	0	0	3600	✗
China	P5/G20/BRICS/APEC/SCO	Blue-water navy	2 / 3	1	11,775	✓
Egypt	African Union/Arab League/D-8/MNNA		2 / 0	0	3760	✗
France	P5/G20/G7/EU/NATO/Quint	Blue-water navy	3 / 1	10	10,300	✓
Germany	G20/G7/G4/EU/NATO/Quint	Green-water navy	0	1	3597	Nuclear sharing
India	G20/BRICS/G4/Commonwealth/SAARC/SCO/QUAD	Blue-water navy	2 / 2	6	6430	✓
Iran	ECO/OPEC/GECF/SCO/BRICS/D-8	Green-water navy	0	3		✗
Indonesia	G20/ASEAN/APEC/MIKTA/BRICS/D-8/NAM/EAS/OIC		0	0	3064	✗
Italy	G20/G7/UFC/EU/NATO/Quint	Blue-water navy	1 / 2	2	6000	Nuclear sharing
Japan	G20/G7/G4/APEC/MNNA/QUAD	Green-water navy	2 / 2	1	278	✗
Mexico	G20/MIKTA/APEC/UFC		0	0		✗
Netherlands	EU/NATO	Green-water navy	0	0	650	Nuclear sharing
Nigeria	African Union/OPEC/Commonwealth/D-8	Green-water navy	0	0	2190	✗
Pakistan	D-8/ UFC/SCO/MNNA/SAARC/IMCTC/Commonwealth		0	1	5264	✓
Poland	EU/NATO		0	0	3000	✗
Russia	P5/G20/BRICS/SCO/EAEU/APEC/CSTO/CIS	Blue-water navy	0 / 1	10	48,500	✓
Saudi Arabia	G20/OPEC/OIC/GCC/Arab League		0	0		✗
South Africa	G20/BRICS/AU/Commonwealth		0	0	1171	✗
South Korea	G20/APEC/MIKTA/UFC/MNNA	Green-water navy	2 / 0	0	1008	✗
Spain	EU/NATO/UFC	Green-water navy	0 / 1	0	1500	✗
Turkey	G20/D-8/MIKTA/NATO/UFC	Green-water navy	1 / 0	12	60,000+	Nuclear sharing
United Kingdom	P5/G20/G7/FVEY/NATO/Quint/FPDA/Commonwealth/AUKUS	Blue-water navy	0 / 2	15	15,000	✓
United States	P5/G20/G7/NATO/APEC/FVEY/Quint/ANZUS/QUAD/Rio/AUKUS	Blue-water navy	11 / 11	38	130,000	✓

== See also ==
- Exercise RIMPAC
- Expeditionary maneuver warfare
- Expeditionary warfare
- Force concentration
- Force multiplication
- List of countries by military expenditures
- List of countries with overseas military bases
- Loss of Strength Gradient
- Military budget of the United States
- Military deployment
- Military globalization
- Military logistics
- Overmatch
- Over-the-beach capability
- Seabasing
- Sovereignty
- Unsinkable aircraft carrier
