= Permanent members of the United Nations Security Council =

Five countries influential in world affairs

The permanent members of the United Nations Security Council

The permanent members of the United Nations Security Council (also known as the Permanent Five, Big Five, or P5) are the five sovereign states to whom the UN Charter of 1945 grants a permanent seat on the UN Security Council: China, France, Russia, (Note: Formerly the Soviet Union) United Kingdom, and United States.

The permanent members were all Allies in World War II (and the victors of that war), and unrelatedly later (Note: When the UN chapter naming the five permanent member states was drafted and signed, no states had working nuclear weapons yet; at ratification in October 1945, only the U.S. had recently become a nuclear power.) became the five states with the first and most nuclear weapons. All have the power of veto, which enables any one of them to block any non-"procedural" Council decision, regardless of its level of international support.

The remaining 10 members of the UN Security Council are elected by the General Assembly, giving a total of 15 UN member states on the Security Council, which convenes meetings at the headquarters of the United Nations in New York City.

Since the establishment of the P5, it has been criticized for a range of reasons. There have been various proposals to reform the UNSC, including the introduction of new permanent members for the G4 nations of Brazil, Germany, India, and Japan. The Uniting for Consensus movement, under the leadership of Italy, opposes these bids.

== Permanent members ==
=== Current Permanent members ===
The following is a table of the current permanent members of the United Nations Security Council.

State	Former representation of state	Current representation of state	Current dignitary of state	Permanent representative
China	(Taiwan) Republic of China (Note: On 25 October 1971, through UN Resolution 2758, the People's Republic of China was recognized as the legal representative of the Chinese seat on the Security Council in place of the Republic of China on Taiwan.) (1945–1949, 1949–1971)	People's Republic of China	President: Xi Jinping Premier: Li Qiang	Fu Cong
France	Provisional Government of the French Republic (1945–1946) French Fourth Republic (1946–1958)	French Fifth Republic	President: Emmanuel Macron Prime Minister: Sébastien Lecornu	Jérôme Bonnafont
Russia	Union of Soviet Socialist Republics (1945–1991)	Russian Federation	President: Vladimir Putin Prime Minister: Mikhail Mishustin	Vasily Nebenzya
United Kingdom	—N/a	United Kingdom of Great Britain and Northern Ireland	Monarch: King Charles III Prime Minister: Andy Burnham	Sarah MacIntosh
United States	—N/a	United States of America	President: Donald Trump Vice President: JD Vance	Mike Waltz

=== Former Permanent Members ===
- Republic of China, 1945–1971 (replaced by People's Republic of China)
- Soviet Union, 1945–1991 (replaced by Russian Federation)

== History ==
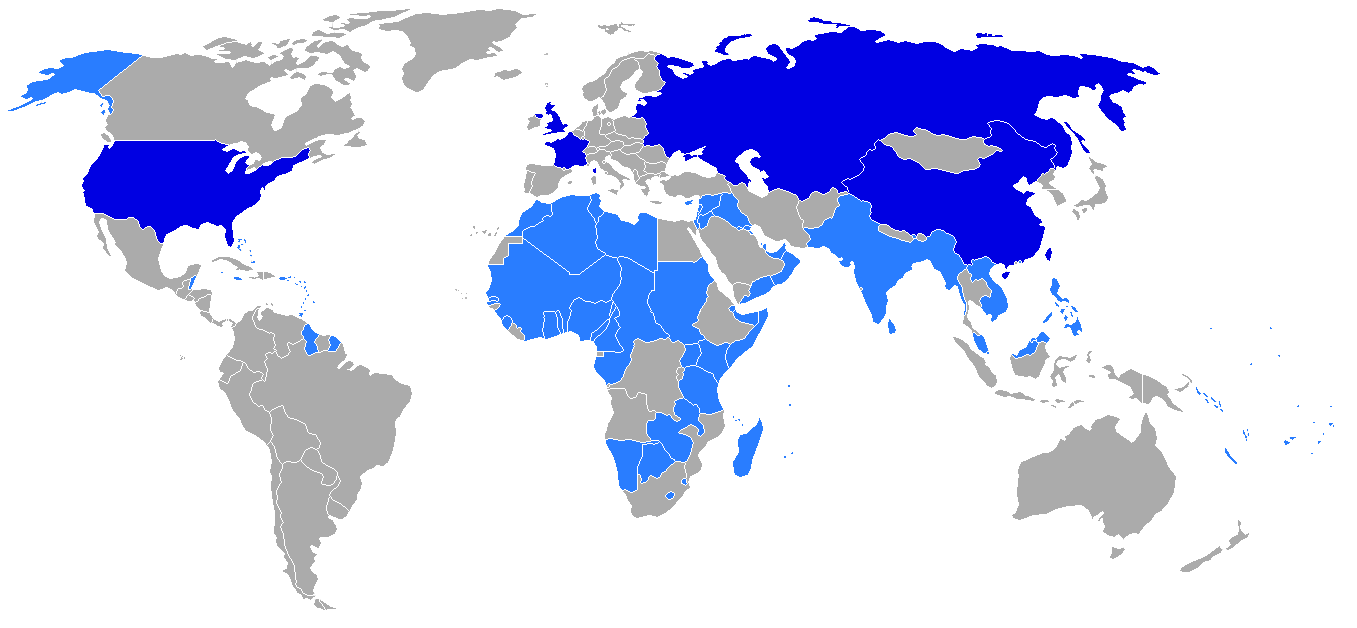
The original permanent members of the United Nations Security Council in 1945 (dark blue) with their respective colonies and other holdings shown (pale blue)

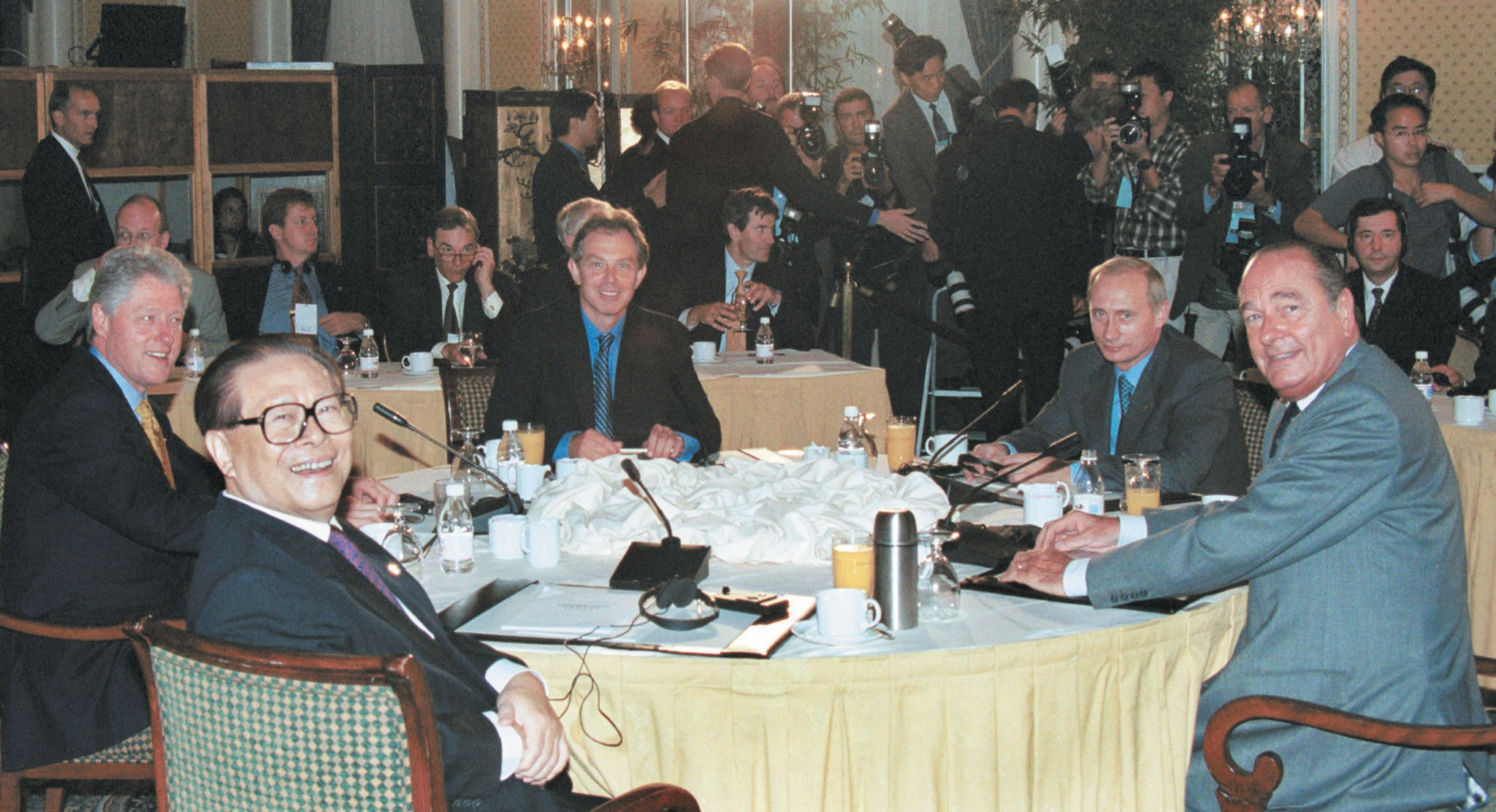
Leaders of the five permanent member states at the Millennium Summit in 2000. Clockwise from front left: Chinese president Jiang Zemin, US president Bill Clinton, UK prime minister Tony Blair, Russian president Vladimir Putin, and French president Jacques Chirac.

Based on the consensus concerning the Security Council's structure agreed upon at the 1944 Dumbarton Oaks Conference and subsequently at UN's founding in 1945, the five permanent members of the Security Council were the French Republic, the Republic of China, the Soviet Union, the United Kingdom, and the United States. There have been two seat changes since then, although these have not been reflected in Article 23 of the UN Charter, as it has not been accordingly amended:

- China's seat was originally held by the Nationalist government of the Republic of China (ROC). However, it lost the Chinese Civil War and retreated to the island of Taiwan in 1949. The Chinese Communist Party won control of Mainland China and established the People's Republic of China (PRC). In 1971, UN General Assembly Resolution 2758 recognised the PRC as the legal representative of China in the UN, and gave it the seat on the Security Council that had been held by the ROC, which was expelled from the UN altogether. Both the ROC and the PRC continue to claim de jure sovereignty over the entirety of China (including Taiwan). However, only 12 states continue to officially recognise the ROC as the sole legitimate government of China.
- After the dissolution of the Soviet Union in 1991, Russia was recognised as the legal successor state of the Soviet Union and maintained the latter's position on the Security Council.

Additionally, between the founding of the United Nations and the end of the 20th century, many of the overseas territories of the United Kingdom and France became independent with the breakup of the British Empire and French colonial empire, and France had a reduction in de jure territory with the independence of Algeria in 1962. (Note: At the time, both the law of France and the United Nations list of non-self-governing territories recognized French Algeria as a part of France, instead of a colony of France.) France maintained its seat as there was no change in its international status or recognition. (During this time, France also reformed its provisional government into the French Fourth Republic in 1946 and into the French Fifth Republic in 1958, both under the leadership of Charles de Gaulle.)

The five permanent members of the Security Council were the victorious powers in World War II and have maintained the world's most powerful military forces ever since. They annually top the list of countries with the highest military expenditures along with India and Germany; in 2011, they spent over US$1 trillion combined on defence, accounting for over 60% of global military expenditures (the US alone accounting for over 40%). They are also among the world's top 10 largest arms exporters and are the only nations officially recognised as "nuclear-weapon states" under the Treaty on the Non-Proliferation of Nuclear Weapons (NPT), though there are other states known or believed to be in possession of nuclear weapons.

== Veto power ==
The "power of veto" refers to the veto power wielded solely by the permanent members, enabling them to prevent the adoption of any "substantive" draft Council resolution, regardless of the level of international support for the draft. The veto does not apply to procedural votes, which is significant in that the Security Council's permanent membership can vote against a "procedural" draft resolution, without necessarily blocking its adoption by the council.

The veto is exercised when any permanent member — the so-called "P5" — casts a "negative" vote on a "substantive" draft resolution. Abstention or absence from the vote by a permanent member does not prevent a draft resolution from being adopted.

== Expansion ==
The G4 nations: Brazil, Germany, India, and Japan

There have been proposals for the introduction of new permanent members. The candidates usually mentioned are Brazil, Germany, India, and Japan. They compose the group of four countries known as the G4 nations, which mutually support one another's bids for permanent seats.

This sort of reform has historically been opposed by Uniting for Consensus, which is composed primarily of nations that are regional rivals and economic competitors of the G4. The group is composed of:

- Italy, Spain, Netherlands and San Marino (opposing Germany)
- Colombia, Mexico, Argentina and Costa Rica (opposing Brazil)
- Pakistan and Turkey (opposing India)
- China, Russia, Indonesia, North Korea and South Korea (opposing Japan)
- Argentina, Canada, Colombia, Costa Rica, Italy, Malta, Mexico, Pakistan, South Korea, San Marino, Spain and Turkey (opposing G4 nations)

Since 1992, Italy and other council members have instead proposed semi-permanent seats or expanding the number of temporary seats. In 2024, the United States proposed the creation of two permanent seats on the Security Council for African countries, in the event of an expansion of the Security Council.

Most of the leading candidates for permanent membership are regularly elected onto the Security Council by their respective groups. Japan was elected for eleven two-year terms, Brazil for ten terms, and Germany for three terms. India has been elected to the council eight times in total, with the most recent successful bid being in 2020.

In 2013, the P5 and G4 members of the UN Security Council accounted for eight of the world's ten largest defence budgets, according to the Stockholm International Peace Research Institute (SIPRI).

== Comparison ==
Comparison of P5 nations
Country data	CHN	FRA	RUS	U.K.	U.S.
Region	Asia-Pacific	Western; Europe and Others	Eastern; Europe	Western; Europe and Others	Western; Europe and Others (observer)
Population	17.9% 2nd	0.9% 20th	1.9% 9th	0.9% 21st	4.2% 3rd
Territory	9,596,961 km² 4th	640,679 km² 42nd	17,098,246 km² 1st	242,495 km² 78th	9,833,517 km² 3rd
GDP (nominal) (US$trillion)	$19.4; 2nd	$3.36; 7th	$2.54; 9th	$3.96; 6th	$30.61; 1st
GDP (PPP) (US$trillion)	$41.01; 1st	$4.53; 9th	$7.14; 4th	$4.45; 10th	$30.61; 2nd
UN funding^{1}	12.01% 2nd	4.43% 6th	2.41% 10th	4.57% 5th	22.00% 1st
UN peacekeeping funding^{2}	15.22% 2nd	5.61% 6th	3.04% 8th	5.79% 5th	27.89% 1st
UN peacekeepers	2,531; 9th	706; 30th	70; 70th	279; 48th	33; 78th
Defence budget (US$billion)	$292.0; 2nd	$53.0; 8th	$86.4; 3rd	$68.5; 6th	$887.0; 1st
Military (active)	2,185,000; 1st	203,250; 22nd	1,320,000; 4th	148,500; 34th	1,328,100; 3rd
Military (reserve)	510,000; 9th	56,000; 41st	2,000,000; 2nd	80,000; 35th	844,950; 7th
Paramilitary (active)	660,000; 6th	14,350; 60th	554,000; 60th	0 —	0 —
Military (total)	4,015,000; 5th	380,600; 28th	3,874,000; 6th	275,053; 40th	2,072,950; 8th
Active space program	✓	✓	✓	✓	✓
Helicopter carriers projects	✓	✓	✓	✗	✓
Aircraft carriers projects	✓	✓	✓	✓	✓
Nuclear submarines projects	✓	✓	✓	✓	✓
Active nuclear arsenal	600 3rd	290 4th	5,977 1st	225 5th	5,428 2nd
^{1}share of annual UN budget ^{2}share of funding for UN peacekeeping

== See also ==
- List of members of the United Nations Security Council
- List of country groupings
- Uniting for Consensus

=== Relations between permanent members ===
- China–France relations
- China–Russia relations
- China–United Kingdom relations
- China–United States relations
- France–Russia relations
- France–United Kingdom relations
- France–United States relations
- Russia–United Kingdom relations
- Russia–United States relations
- United Kingdom–United States relations
