= G4 nations =

Brazil, Germany, India, and Japan in the UN

G4
- Grupo dos Quatro (Portuguese); Gruppe der Vier (German); ४ राष्ट्रों का समूह (Hindi); G4諸国 (Japanese)
- Map of G4 countries
- Formation: 2005
- Type: Political cooperative alliance
- Purpose: Reform of the UNSC
- Members: G4 nations: Brazil; Germany; India; Japan
- Leader: Brazil President Luiz Inácio Lula da Silva Germany Chancellor Friedrich Merz India Prime Minister Narendra Modi Japan Prime Minister Sanae Takaichi

The G4 nations, comprising Brazil, Germany, India, and Japan, are four countries which support each other's attempts to gain permanent seats on the United Nations Security Council. Unlike the G7, where the common denominator of the members is related to the economy and long-term political goals, the G4's primary aim is to reform the Security Council. Each of these four countries have figured among the elected non-permanent members of the council since the UN's establishment. Their economic, political and military influence has grown significantly in the last decades, reaching a scope comparable to the permanent members (P5). However, the G4's bids are often opposed by the Uniting for Consensus movement led by Italy, and particularly by the G4's economic competitors and political rivals.

== Background ==
The United Nations currently has five permanent members with veto power in the Security Council: China, France, Russia, the United Kingdom, and the United States – comprising the victors, or successor states of the victors, of World War II. The G4 nations are regularly elected to two-year terms on the Security Council as non-permanent members by their respective regional groups: in the 24-year period from 1987 to 2010, Brazil and Japan were elected for five terms each, Germany for four terms (one term as West Germany and three terms as unified Germany) and India for eight terms. Cumulatively, the G4 has spent 64 years on the Security Council since the UN's inception, with each country serving at least a decade.

Comparison of G4 and P5 nations
Country data	Brazil	Germany	India	Japan	China	France	Russia	United Kingdom	United States
G4 nation or P5 nation	G4	G4	G4	G4	P5	P5	P5	P5	P5
Region	Latin America and Caribbean	Western; Europe and Others	Indo-Pacific	Indo-Pacific	Indo-Pacific	Western; European and Others	Eastern; Europe	Western; Europe and Others	Western Europe and Others (observer)
Population	2.7% 7th	1.1% 19th	17.9% 1st	1.6% 11th	17.9% 2nd	0.9% 20th	1.9% 9th	0.9% 21st	4.2% 3rd
Territory	8 515 767 km2 5th	357 114 km2 62nd	3 287 263 km2 7th	377 973 km2 61st	9 596 961 km2 4th	640 679 km2 42nd	17 098 246 km2 1st	242 495 km2 78th	9 833 517 km2 3rd
GDP (nominal) (US$trillion)	$2.63; 10th	$5.45; 3rd	$4.15; 6th	$4.37; 4th	$20.85; 2nd	$3.59; 7th	$2.63; 9th	$4.26; 5th	$32.38; 1st
GDP (PPP) (US$trillion)	$4.973; 8th	$6.153; 6th	$17.714; 3rd	$6.758; 5th	$41.015; 1st	$4.533; 9th	$7.143; 4th	$4.454; 10th	$30.615; 2nd
UN funding^{1}	2.95% 8th	6.09% 4th	0.83% 21st	8.56% 3rd	12.01% 2nd	4.43% 6th	2.41% 10th	4.57% 5th	22.00% 1st
UN peacekeeping funding^{2}	0.59% 19th	6.09% 4th	0.17% 38th	8.56% 3rd	15.22% 2nd	5.61% 6th	3.04% 8th	5.79% 5th	27.89% 1st
UN peacekeepers	282; 47th	504; 37th	5,353; 5th	6; 105th	2,531; 9th	706; 30th	70; 70th	279; 48th	33; 78th
Defence budget (US$billion)	$20.9; 21st	$88.5; 4th	$86.1; 5th	$55.3; 10th	$314.0; 2nd	$64.7; 9th	$149.0; 3rd	$81.8; 6th	$997.0; 1st
Military (active)	374,500; 14th	179,850; 26th	1,475,750; 2nd	247,150; 22nd	2,035,000; 1st	202,000; 23rd	1,134,000; 5th	141,100; 35th	1,315,600; 3rd
Military (reserve)	1,415,000; 5th	34,100; 52nd	1,155,000; 6th	55,900; 41st	510,000; 10th	38,500; 49th	1,500,000; 4th	70,450; 34th	797,200; 7th
Paramilitary (active)	395,000; 7th	0 —	1,616,050; 3rd	14,800; 59th	500,000; 5th	95,100; 22nd	569,000; 4th	0 —	0 —
Military (total)	2,184,500; 7th	213,950; 45th	4,246,800; 4th	317,850; 34th	3,045,000; 6th	335,600; 33rd	3,203,000; 5th	211,550; 46th	2,112,800; 8th
Active space program	✓	✓	✓	✓	✓	✓	✓	✓	✓
Helicopter carriers projects	✓	✗	✓	✓	✓	✓	✓	✗	✓
Aircraft carriers projects	✗	✗	✓	✓	✓	✓	✓	✓	✓
Nuclear submarines projects	✓	✗	✓	✗	✓	✓	✓	✓	✓
Active nuclear arsenal	✗	✗ ^{3}	190 6th	✗	350 3rd	290 4th	5,977 1st	225 5th	5,428 2nd
^{1}share of annual UN budget ^{2}share of funding for UN peacekeeping ^{3}Germany takes part in NATO nuclear weapons sharing agreement

== Opinions ==
=== Support ===
The United Kingdom and France have backed the G4's bid for permanent seats on the United Nations Security Council. Japan has received support from the United States and the United Kingdom.

All the permanent members of P5 have supported India's bids for permanent seat on the United Nations Security Council (UNSC), but China has previously implied that it is only ready to support India's bid for a permanent seat on United Nations Security Council if India does not associate its bid with Japan.

The United States has sent strong indications to Brazil that it is willing to support its membership, albeit without a veto. The Council on Foreign Relations recommended that the U.S. government fully endorse the inclusion of Brazil as a permanent member of the Security Council. Brazil has received backing from three of the current permanent members, namely France, Russia, and the United Kingdom.

In the final document of the 2019 BRICS summit, China and Russia say they "reiterate the importance of a comprehensive Security Council reform" and "support Brazil and India's aspiration for more relevant UN roles".

As stated by the Minister of Foreign Affairs Sergey Lavrov at the Raisina Dialogue in New Delhi in January 2020: "I would say the Security Council's main shortcoming is the under-representation of developing countries. We reiterate our position that India and Brazil absolutely deserve to be on the council together with an African candidate, our position is that the purpose of the reform is to make sure that the developing countries enjoy a better treatment in the central organ of the United Nations".

=== Opposition ===
There has been discontent among the present permanent members regarding the inclusion of controversial nations or countries not supported by them. For instance, Japan's bid is opposed by China, Russia, North Korea and South Korea.

Under the leadership of Spain and Italy, countries that strongly oppose the G4 countries' bids have formed the Uniting for Consensus movement, composed mainly of regional powers that oppose the rise of some nearby country to permanent member status. Uniting for Consensus supports expanding the number of non-permanent security council members and restricting the usage of the veto. The bloc argues that adding more permanent seats to the security council only benefits the nations that gain those seats, and believes that an expansion of the non-permanent membership will make the UNSC both more flexible and more democratic.

In Latin America, the countries Colombia, Mexico and Argentina oppose a seat for Brazil. In Asia, Pakistan opposes India's bid.

Another counter-proposal, the Ezulwini Consensus, was presented by the African Union, calling for the addition of five new non-permanent seats and two new permanent seats to be allocated to African nations, in response to a lack of African representation on the Security Council.

== Activity ==
The G4 and P5 members as a future reformed UNSC

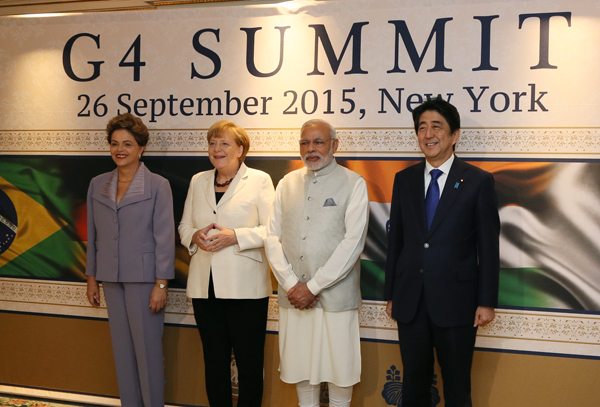
Meeting of G4 leaders (September 26, 2015)

The G4 suggested that two African nations, in addition to themselves, be included in the enlarged UNSC. In several conferences during the summer of 2005, African Union was unable to agree on two nominees: Egypt, Nigeria and South Africa all lay claim to a permanent African UNSC seat.

A UN General Assembly in September 2005 marked the 60th anniversary of the UN and the members were to decide on a number of necessary reforms—including the enlarged Security Council. However the unwillingness to find a negotiable position stopped even the most urgent reforms; the September 2005 General Assembly was a setback for the UN.

The G4 retain their goal of permanent UNSC membership for all four nations (plus two African nations). In January 2006, Japan announced it would not support putting the G4 resolution back on the table, not to interfere with any effort by the African Union to unite behind a single plan. And meanwhile, Japan's continuing relations with the G4 were not mutually exclusive. G4 issued a joint statement on 12 February 2011, in which their foreign ministers agreed to seek concrete outcome in the current session of the UN General Assembly.

In September 2015, Narendra Modi, the Prime Minister of India, invited the leaders of the G4 for a summit following the adoption of UN General Assembly Decision 69/560 by consensus, which moved forward for the first time. In 2017, it was reported that the G4 nations were willing to temporarily forgo veto power if granted a permanent UNSC seat.

In September 2019, in a joint press statement during the 74th session of the United Nations General Assembly, the G4 ministers reiterated their strong commitment to an early and comprehensive reform of the UNSC. Bearing in mind that in 2020 the United Nations would celebrate its 75th anniversary, the G4 ministers also expressed their firm hope that the current session of the General Assembly would pave the way for finally moving on the call for an ‘early reform’ of the Security Council and underscored their steadfast support for Africa's representation in both the permanent and non-permanent categories of membership of a future reform.

In September 2023, in a joint press statement during the 78th session of the United Nations General Assembly, the foreign ministers of G4, joined to discuss the state of play of the negotiations for the reform of the UNSC, and reiterated that the expansion of the Security Council is essential to make the body more representative, legitimate, effective and efficient, adding that Africa needs to be represented in both the permanent and non-permanent categories of membership of a reformed and expanded Council.

In November 2025, in reference to the 80th anniversary of the United Nations, Brazil, supported by Germany, India, and Japan, called for the start of reform negotiations, stating, "as confidence in the UN is shaken and the international order anchored in international law and the UN Charter faces unprecedented pressure, reform is necessary not only to strengthen this organization as a whole, but also to reinforce the entire multilateral system on which it is based and sustained".

== Current leaders of the G4 Nations ==
The following are the head of state and heads of government that represent the members of the G4 nations as of 2025:

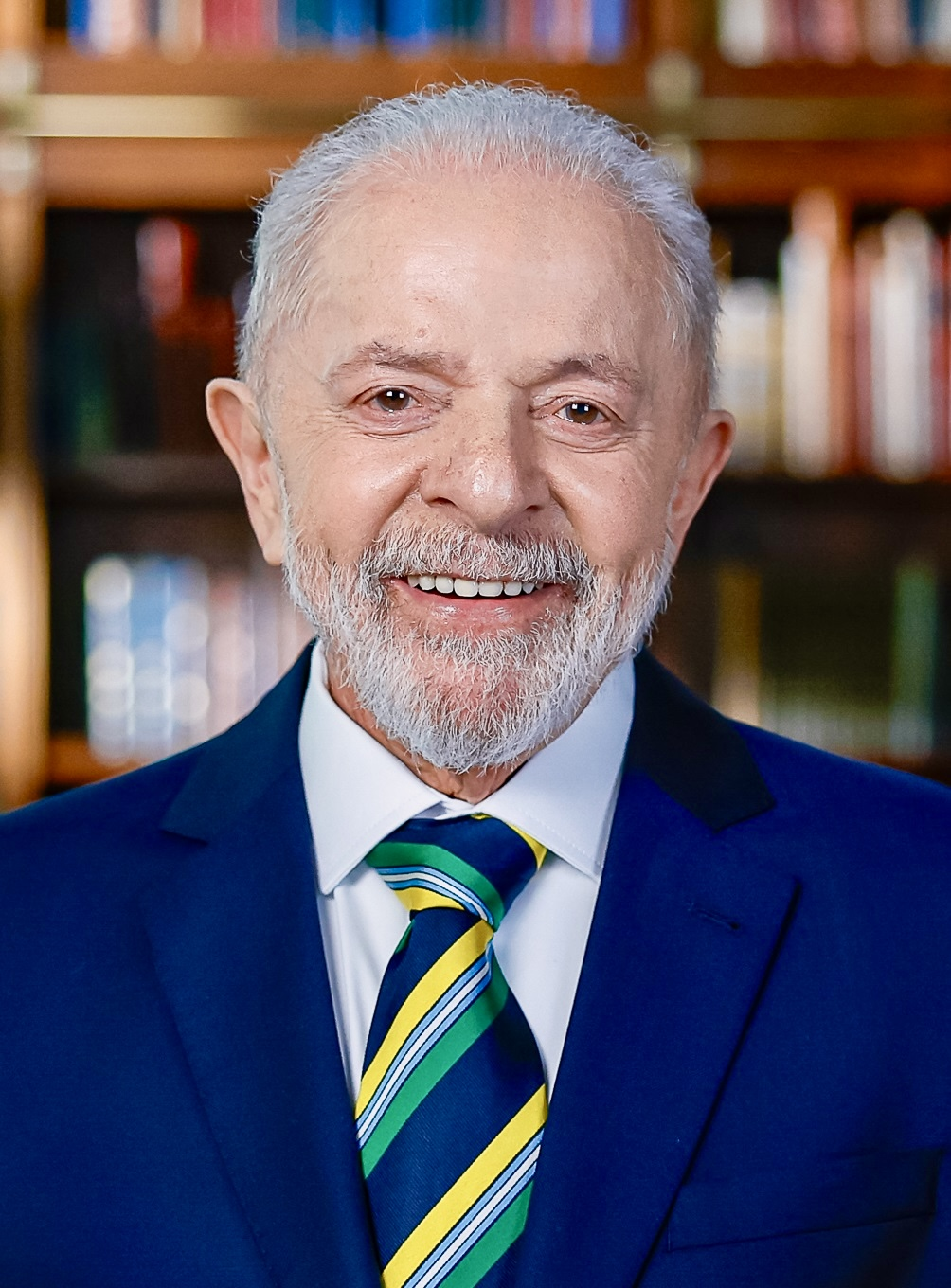
(Brazil) Lula da Silva
President of the
Federative Republic of Brazil
since 1 January 2023

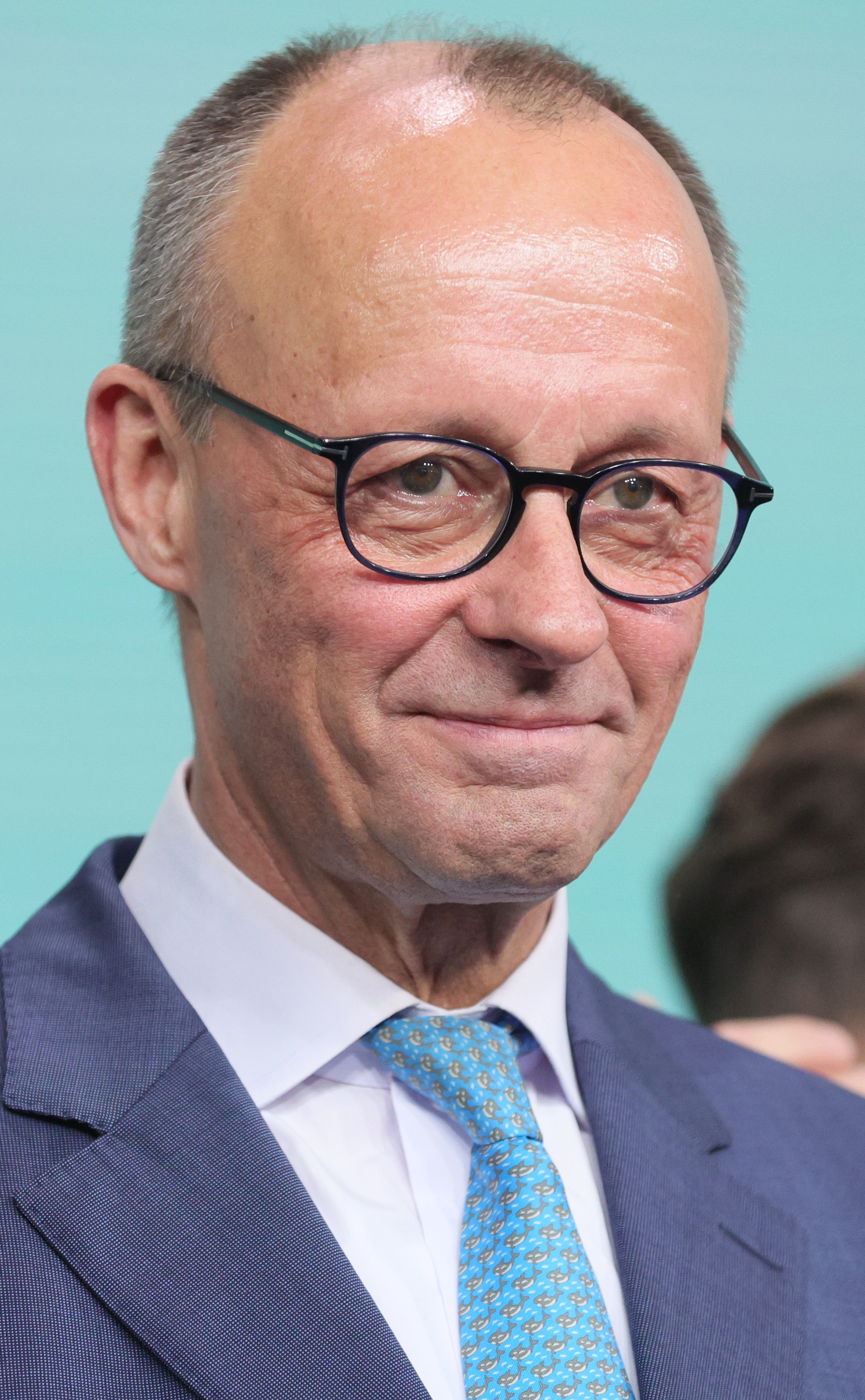
(Germany) Friedrich Merz
Chancellor of the
Federal Republic of Germany
since 6 May 2025

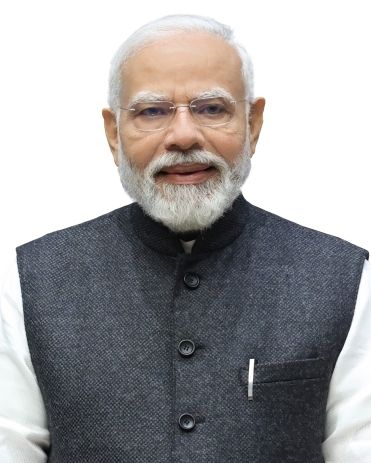
(India) Narendra Modi
Prime Minister of the
Republic of India
since 26 May 2014

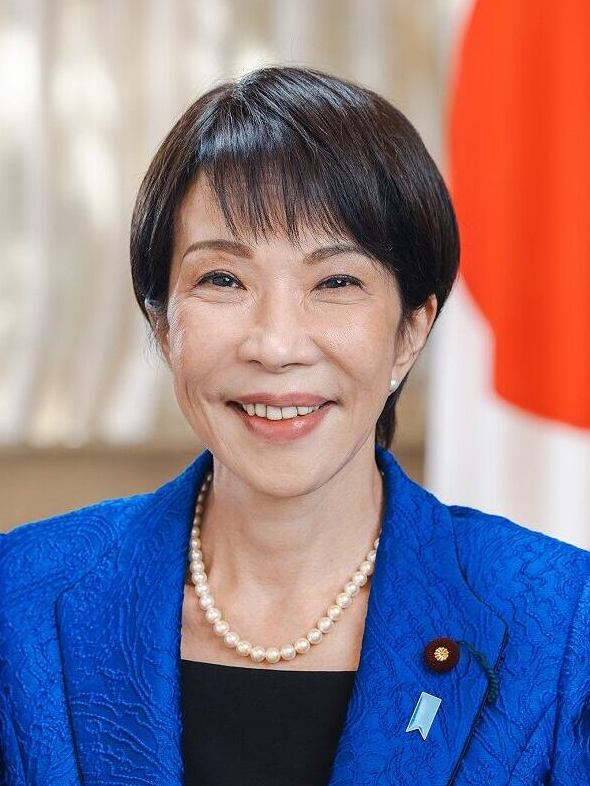
(Japan) Sanae Takaichi
Prime Minister of the
State of Japan
since 21 October 2025

=== Current ministerial leaders ===
Member	Minister of Foreign/External Affairs	Defense Minister
Brazil	Mauro Vieira	José Múcio
Germany	Johann Wadephul	Boris Pistorius
India	Subrahmanyam Jaishankar	Rajnath Singh
Japan	Toshimitsu Motegi	Shinjirō Koizumi

== See also ==
- Group of Five
- Group of Eleven
- G8+5
- List of country groupings
- List of multilateral free-trade agreements
- BRICS
- MIKTA
- Coffee Club

=== Relations between G4 countries ===
- Brazil–Germany relations
- Brazil–India relations
- Brazil–Japan relations
- Germany–India relations
- Germany–Japan relations
- India–Japan relations

=== Relations between G4 and P5 countries ===
- Brazil–China relations
- Brazil–France relations
- Brazil–Russia relations
- Brazil–United Kingdom relations
- Brazil–United States relations
- China–Germany relations
- France–Germany relations
- Germany–Russia relations
- Germany–United Kingdom relations
- Germany–United States relations
- China–India relations
- France–India relations
- India–Russia relations
- India–United Kingdom relations
- India–United States relations
- China–Japan relations
- France–Japan relations
- Japan–Russia relations
- Japan–United Kingdom relations
- Japan–United States relations

=== Relations between P5 countries ===
- China–France relations
- China–Russia relations
- China–United Kingdom relations
- China–United States relations
- France–Russia relations
- France–United Kingdom relations
- France–United States relations
- Russia–United Kingdom relations
- Russia–United States relations
- United Kingdom–United States relations
