= Uniting for Consensus =

Group of countries opposing UN Security Council expansion

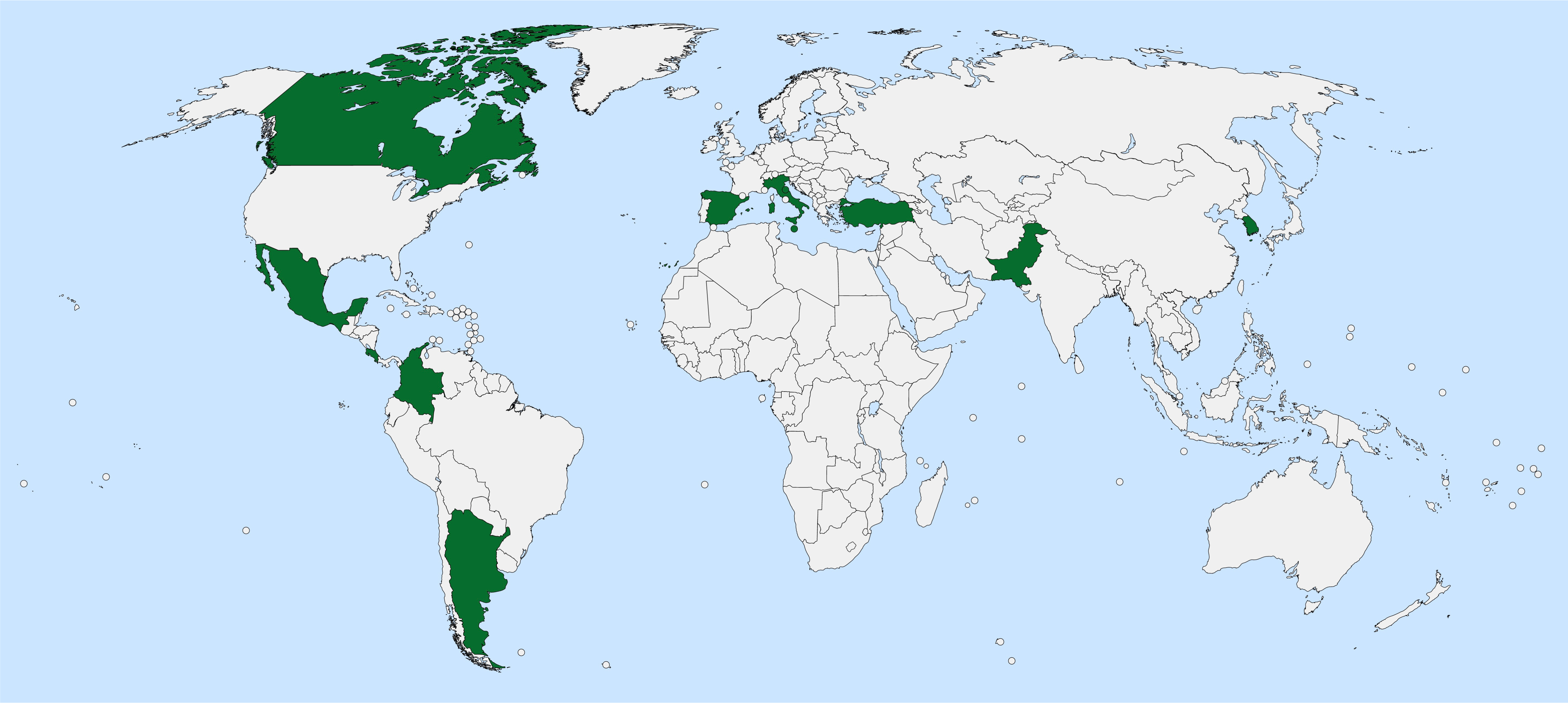
Uniting for Consensus core members

Uniting for Consensus (UfC) is an international movement established in 2005 as an evolution of the Coffee Club, that developed in the 1990s as a coalition of countries in opposition to the possible expansion of permanent seats in the United Nations Security Council. Under the leadership of Italy, it aims to counter the bids for permanent seats proposed by G4 nations (Brazil, Germany, India, and Japan) and is calling for a consensus before any decision is reached on the form and size of the United Nations Security Council.

== History ==
Italy, through the ambassador Francesco Paolo Fulci, along with Pakistan, Mexico and Egypt, founded the "Coffee Club" in 1995. The four countries were united by a rejection of the proposal to increase the number of permanent members of the Security Council, instead desiring to encourage the expansion of non-permanent seats. The founders of the group were soon joined by other countries, including Argentina, Colombia, Costa Rica, Malta, Mexico, Pakistan, San Marino, South Korea, Spain, Turkey and Canada, and in a short time the group came to include about 50 countries in Asia, Africa, and Latin America. The thesis of the Uniting for Consensus group is that the increase of permanent seats would further accentuate the disparity between the member countries and result in the extension of a series of privileges with a cascade effect. The new permanent members would in fact benefit from the method of electing, which is particularly advantageous in a number of specific organs of the United Nations System.

During the 59th session of the United Nations General Assembly in 2005, the UfC group — led by the representatives of Canada, Italy, and Pakistan — made a proposal that centred on an enlargement of the number of non-permanent members from ten to twenty. The non-permanent members would be elected by the General Assembly for a two-year term and would be eligible for immediate re-election, subject to the decision of their respective geographical groups. The other members and co-sponsors of the text, entitled "Reform of the Security Council", were listed as Argentina, Colombia, Costa Rica, Malta, Mexico, San Marino, Spain and Turkey. Although the proposal was not accepted, the initiative found broad consensus among member states, including permanent member China.

On 20 April 2009, Italy, acting as representatives of the UfC group, provided a new model of reform, which was presented as a concrete attempt to reach a deal. The document proposed creating a new category of seats, still non-permanent, but elected for an extended duration (3 to 5 years terms) without the possibility of immediate re-election. This new kind of seat would not be allocated to single national countries but rather to regional groups on a rotational basis. As far as traditional categories of seats are concerned, the UfC proposal does not imply any change, but only the introduction of small and medium size states among groups eligible for regular seats. This proposal includes even the question of veto, giving a range of options that goes from abolition to limitation of the application of the veto only to Chapter VII matters.

During that round, Italy firmly rejected the G4 proposal as well as the African Union one and even denounced the unfair behaviour of G4 countries. According to Italy, the G4 is attempting to exclude the UfC proposal from the floor, "on the basis of a presumed level of support". Moreover, Italy believes that it has shown flexibility by putting forward a new proposal in April 2009, while the G4 remained tied to its 2005 document. Italy's active role in current discussions started in February 2009 before the beginning of intergovernmental negotiations, when Minister of Foreign Affairs Franco Frattini hosted more than 75 countries to develop a shared path towards a reform of the Security Council. In May 2011, the members states which have participated in the group meeting held in Rome rose to 120.

Lastly, on 27 February 2024, a new version of UfC model was conveyed to IGN co-chairs and posted on the IGN website which acts as a repository of the process. This proposal was subsequently presented by the Permanent Representative of Italy at the meeting of 7 March 2024 (as part of the 78th session of the UN General Assembly). This model envisions an expansion of elective seats of the Security Council up to a maximum of 27 members (Africa 6, Asia-Pacific 6, GRULAC 4,WEOG 3, EEG 2; SIDS and Small States 1). Some of them could have a longer term of 3–5 years, with the possibility of immediate re-election. While the abolition of Veto power is advocated, UfC suggests addressing negotiations on limiting its use under circumstances such as mass atrocities and war crimes. Furthermore, UfC proposes to review the working methods of the Security Council and to improve the relationship between the Security Council and the General Assembly.

== Member states data ==
As of 27 March 2023, core members of the Uniting for Consensus group were:

Country	UN budget	International Trade (Millions of USD) 2023	GDP (nominal) (Millions of USD) 2023	GDP (PPP) (Millions of USD) 2023	Defense budget (Millions of USD)	Active military	Population	G7	G20	OECD	DAC	MIKTA
Italy	4.999%	1,150,100	2,198,730	1,846,950	34,500	293,202	60,849,247	✓	✓	✓	✓	✗
Canada	3.207%	1,045,200	1,736,869	1,396,131	34,000	68,250	38,953,100	✓	✓	✓	✓	✗
Spain	3.177%	1,025,200	1,493,513	1,413,468	33,984	128,013	46,163,116	✗	✗	✓	✓	✗
Mexico	2.356%	1,031,200	1,154,784	1,661,640	31,859	267,506	112,336,538	✗	✓	✓	✗	✓
South Korea	4.120%	1,001,000	1,116,247	1,554,149	30,800	600,000	50,004,441	✗	✓	✓	✓	✓
Turkey	0.617%	1,000,800	778,089	1,573,565	32,687	866,576	84,724,269	✗	✓	✓	✗	✓
Argentina	0.287%	136,300	447,644	716,419	3,179	73,100	46,117,096	✗	✓	✗	✗	✗
Colombia	0.144%	92,760	327,626	471,890	10,290	285,220	46,748,000	✗	✗	✗	✗	✗
Pakistan	0.082%	58,000	210,566	488,580	5,160	617,000	180,991,000	✗	✗	✗	✗	✗
Costa Rica	0.034%	24,460	40,947	55,020	6,125	155,020	4,301,712	✗	✗	✗	✗	✗
Malta	0.017%	9,200	8,896	10,757	58	1,954	417,617	✗	✗	✗	✗	✗
San Marino	0.003%	6,201	2,048	1,136	10	900	32,404	✗	✗	✗	✗	✗

== See also ==
- Reform of the United Nations Security Council (UNSC)
- G4 nations
- Permanent members of the United Nations Security Council
