= Group of Ten (IMF) =

Countries giving extra funds to the IMF

Group of Ten G10
- G10 member states on the world map
- Membership: Founding members: Belgium; Canada; France; Germany; Italy; Japan; Netherlands; Sweden; United Kingdom; United States; Later members: Switzerland (1983–)
- Establishment: 1962 (64 years ago)

The Group of Ten (G10 or G-10) refers to the group of 11 countries that agreed to participate in the General Arrangements to Borrow (GAB), an agreement to provide the International Monetary Fund (IMF) with additional funds to increase its lending ability.

It was established in 1962 by 10 countries, with Switzerland becoming an associate in 1964 and a full member in 1983. Since then, it is also called the Group of Eleven.

== History ==
The GAB was established in 1962, when the governments of eight International Monetary Fund (IMF) members—Belgium, Canada, France, Italy, Japan, the Netherlands, the United Kingdom, and the United States—and the central banks of two others, West Germany and Sweden, agreed to make resources available to the IMF with an additional $6 billion of their currencies. The additional money was intended to allow the IMF to have increased lending resources.

In 1964, the funds were used by the IMF to rescue the pound sterling. The G10 grew in 1964 by the association of the eleventh member, Switzerland, then not a member of the IMF, but the name of the group remained the same. Switzerland became a full member in January 1983.

== Activities ==
The GAB enables the IMF to borrow specified amounts of currencies from these eleven industrial countries (or their central banks), under certain circumstances. Specifically, a proposal for calls under the GAB may only be made when a proposal for the establishment of an activation period under the New Arrangements to Borrow (NAB) is not accepted by NAB participants, who number 38 countries, amongst which are the BRICS nations and Middle Eastern powers.

The potential amount of credit available to the IMF under the GAB totals SDR 17bn (about $26bn), with an additional SDR 1.5bn available under an associated arrangement with Saudi Arabia. The GAB was established in 1962 and expanded in 1983 to SDR 17bn, from about SDR 6bn. It has been activated ten times, the last time in 1998. The GAB and the associated credit arrangement with Saudi Arabia have been renewed, without modifications, for a period of five years from December 26, 2013.

The Bank for International Settlements (BIS) hosts a publications e-library page for the G10.

=== Observers ===
The following international organizations are official observers of the activities of the G10: the BIS, European Commission, International Monetary Fund, and Organisation for Economic Co-operation and Development. Luxembourg is an associate member.

== See also ==
- EU three
- Big Four (Western Europe)
- Group of Six (G6)
- Group of Seven (G7)
- Group of Twelve (G12)
- G10 currencies
