= MIKTA =

Informal partnership between Mexico, Indonesia, South Korea, Turkey and Australia

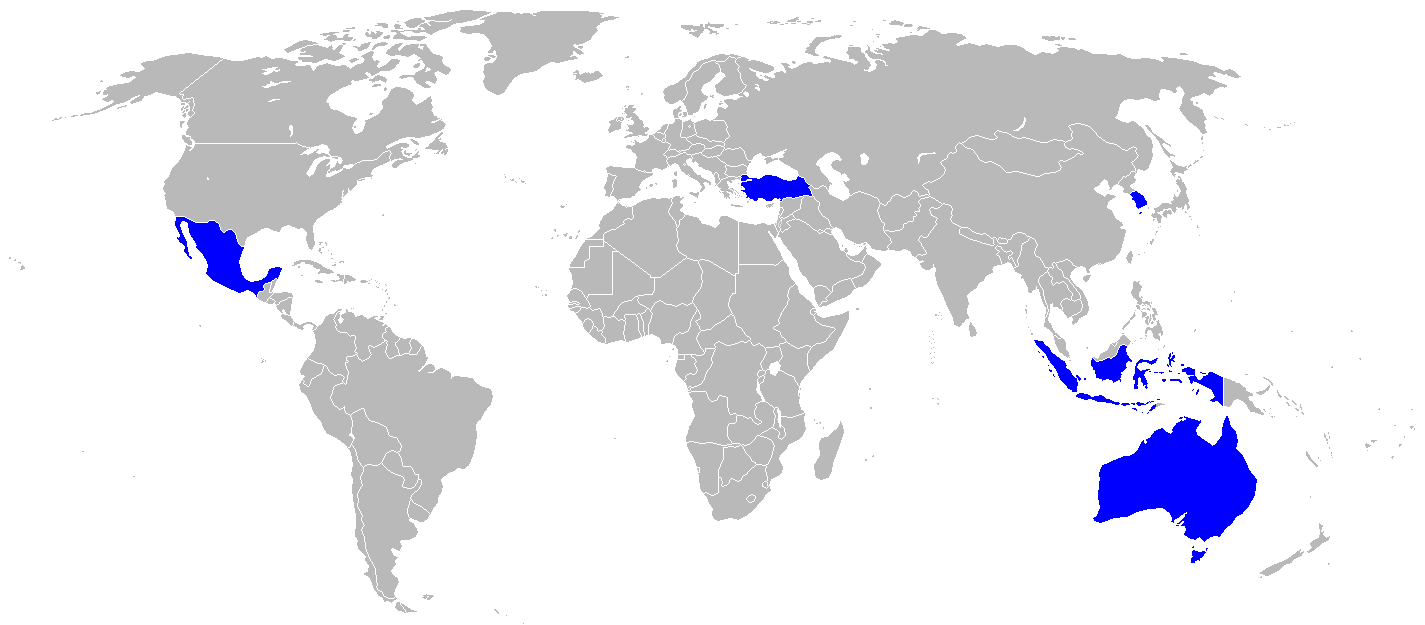
- Formation: 25 September 2013; 13 years ago
- Type: Intergovernmental organization
- Purpose: A cross-regional group of G20 member nations serving as a consultative platform which increases mutual understanding, deepens bilateral ties, and helps to find common ground for cooperation
- Region served: Worldwide
- Members: Mexico; Indonesia; South Korea; Turkey; Australia
- Website: MIKTA.org

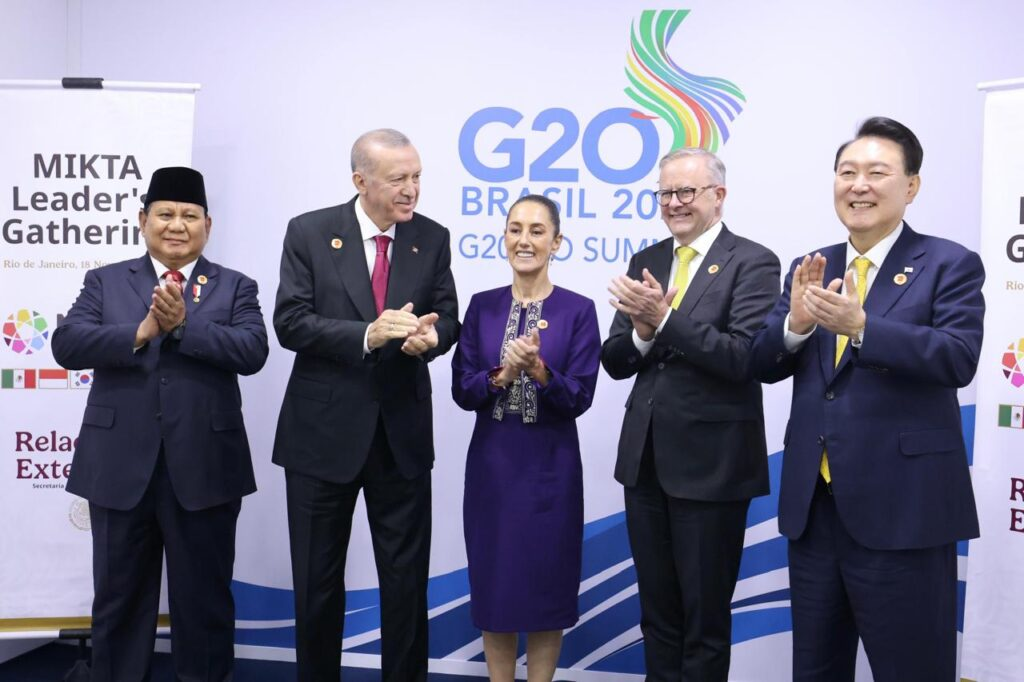
Head of Government of MIKTA nations gathering in 2024 G20 Rio de Janeiro summit: (L-R) Indonesia's Prabowo Subianto, Turkiye's Recep Tayyip Erdoğan, Mexico's Claudia Sheinbaum, Australia's Anthony Albanese, and South Korea's Yoon Suk Yeol

MIKTA is an informal middle power partnership between Mexico, Indonesia, South Korea, Turkey, and Australia. It is led by the Foreign Ministers. It was created in 2013 on the sidelines of the United Nations General Assembly in New York City and aims to support effective global governance.

"The group's diverse membership – in terms of culture, socio-economic structure and geography – lends it a unique perspective. It is a cross-regional, values-based partnership with several key commonalities. Importantly, all member states are G20 economies with similar GDP and an interest in ensuring global governance systems work for all states regardless of size and influence. These similarities provide a strong foundation for mutual cooperation".

Furthermore, the diversity within the partnership allows the members to share their knowledge and perspectives resulting from varied experiences.

== Nature of partnership ==
=== Consultative platform ===
A key aspect that distinguishes MIKTA from other multilateral groups is that it is an informal consultative platform, rather than a formal organisation. It provides a space for dialogue and innovative diplomacy to address current global issues. Information sharing and increased mutual understanding are central features of MIKTA.

=== Strengths ===
"One of MIKTA's key strengths is its flexibility. It provides an informal environment in which topical issues can be discussed, without pressure to reach a consensus. It seeks to assume an adaptable form of multilateral cooperation, in contrast to traditional ‘blocs’, so as to afford an enhanced ability to maneuver effective global governance in a world of fast-paced developments".

As all MIKTA members are also members of broader international organisations, such as the United Nations, World Trade Organization and G20, issues relevant to those forums can form the topics of consultation in MIKTA. This may involve cooperating on commitments made within those organisations or, on occasion, committing to additional goals or standards. It also provides an opportunity for these regional powers to engage in dialogue independently of larger economic powers.

== Meetings ==
The MIKTA Foreign Ministers meet regularly. A retreat-style meeting is held annually in the chairing country. The members have also met on the sidelines of the UN General Assembly Leader's Week and the G20.

== Chair ==
The chair of MIKTA rotates annually.

Year	Chair
2014	Mexico
2015	South Korea
2016	Australia
2017	Turkey
2018	Indonesia
2019	Mexico
2020	South Korea
2021	Australia
2022	Turkey
2023	Indonesia
2024	Mexico
2025	South Korea
2026	Australia

== Areas of interest ==
MIKTA has agreed to work together on a number of thematic issues.

These include:

- international energy governance and energy access;
- counter-terrorism and security;
- peacekeeping;
- trade and the economy;
- gender equality;
- good governance; and
- sustainable development.

== Activities ==
MIKTA engages in a variety of activities in line with its core areas of interest. These include sharing information, releasing joint statements, non-papers that contribute to progress on multilateral issues, advocating common messages across each member's networks, workshops for technical experts and side events to support outcomes at major international events.

Major activities of MIKTA thus far are listed below.

- Joint communiqués
  - from 6 Foreign Ministers’ Meetings
- Joint statements
  - North Korean nuclear test (Jan 2016)
  - Terrorist attack in Turkey (Oct 2015)
  - Climate change (Sept 2015)
  - Financing for development (July 2015)
  - Commemorating International Women's Day (March 2015)
  - Ebola outbreak and global health (Sept 2014)
  - Downing of Malaysia Airlines Flight MH17 (July 2014)
- Joint op-ed (Jan 2015)
- MIKTA Speakers' Conference
- Speakers’ Consultations
- Exchange programs
  - Exchange of Diplomats (Ankara and Istanbul, Feb 2016)
  - Exchange of Young Professionals (Seoul, July 2015)
  - Exchange of Journalists (Seoul, May 2015)
- Workshops
  - MIKTA Workshop on Electronic Commerce (Geneva, 5 July 2016)
  - Third MIKTA Development Cooperation Workshop (Canberra, 1 April 2016)
  - Second MIKTA Development Cooperation Workshop (Seoul, 11 May 2015)
- Academics network
  - MIKTA Academic Conference: Unlocking Global Innovation (Canberra, April 14–15, 2016)
  - The 1st MIKTA Academic Network Conference: Partnership in Knowledge for Better Global Governance (Seoul, May 11–12, 2015)

(Participating academic institutions: CIDE of Mexico, The Habibie Center of Indonesia, IFANS of the Republic of Korea, TEPAV of Turkey, and Coral Bell School, ANU of Australia.)

== Leaders ==
Member	Leader	Name	Foreign Ministers	Name	Finance minister	Name	Central bank governor
Australia	Prime Minister	Anthony Albanese	Minister for Foreign Affairs	Penny Wong	Treasurer	Jim Chalmers	Michele Bullock
Indonesia	President	Prabowo Subianto	Minister of Foreign Affairs	Sugiono	Minister of Finance	Suahasil Nazara	Destry Damayanti
South Korea	President	Lee Jae Myung	Minister of Foreign Affairs	Cho Hyun	Minister of Economy and Finance	Koo Yun-cheol	Hyun Song Shin
Mexico	President	Claudia Sheinbaum	Secretary of Foreign Affairs	Juan Ramón de la Fuente	Secretary of Finance	Rogelio Ramírez de la O	Victoria Rodríguez Ceja
Turkey	President	Recep Tayyip Erdoğan	Minister of Foreign Affairs	Hakan Fidan	Minister of Treasury and Finance	Mehmet Şimşek	Fatih Karahan

== Member country data ==
Member	Total Trade of Goods and Services bil. USD (2019)	Nom. GDP mil. USD (2025)	PPP GDP mil. USD (2025)	Nom. GDP per capita USD (2025)	PPP GDP per capita USD (2025)	HDI (2023)	Population (2022)	G20	DAC	OECD	NATO	BRICS	RCEP	Economic classification (IMF)
Mexico	958	1,692,640	3,395,916	12,692	25,463	0.789	128,533,664	✓	✗	✓	✗	✗	✗	Emerging
Indonesia	370	1,429,743	5,009,483	5,027	17,612	0.728	275,773,800	✓	✗	✗	✗	✓	✓	Emerging
South Korea	1,172	1,790,322	3,365,052	34,642	65,112	0.937	51,638,809	✓	✓	✓	✗	✗	✓	Advanced
Turkey	447	1,437,406	3,651,873	16,709	42,451	0.853	84,680,273	✓	✗	✓	✓	✗	✗	Emerging
Australia	556	1,771,681	1,980,022	64,548	72,138	0.958	26,019,185	✓	✓	✓	✗	✗	✓	Advanced

== See also ==
- List of country groupings
- List of multilateral free-trade agreements
- BRICS
- G7
- G8+5
- Group of 15
- G20
- Group of 24
- D-10 Strategy Forum
- Coffee Club
- Paris Club
