= Group of Twelve (disambiguation) =

The Group of Twelve is a group of industrially advanced countries whose central banks co-operate to regulate international finance.

Group of Twelve may also refer to:

- Dozen, a grouping of twelve
- Group of Twelve (Nicaragua), a group of Sandinista National Liberation Front supporters
