= Group of Twelve =

Central banking cooperation organization

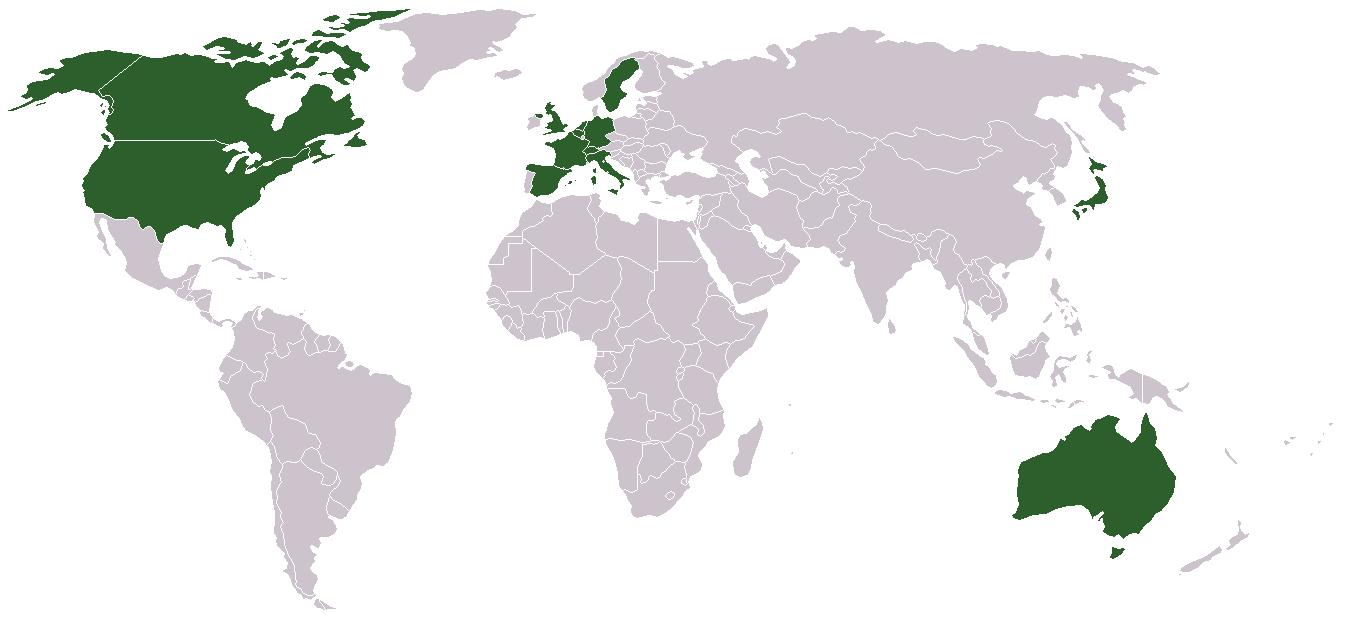
G12 countries.

The Group of Twelve or G12 is a group of industrially advanced countries whose central banks co-operate to regulate international finance.

Note that the G-12 consists of thirteen countries. It encompasses the initial ten members of the International Monetary Fund (IMF), which formed the original G10, adding Australia and Spain. In 1984, when Switzerland joined the G10 and G12, the names of the groups were not changed.

== Members ==
The current G12 member states are:

1. Australia
2. Belgium
3. Canada
4. France
5. Germany
6. Italy
7. Japan
8. Netherlands
9. Spain
10. Sweden
11. Switzerland
12. United Kingdom
13. United States

== See also ==
- Group of Three (G3)
- Group of Four (G4)
- Group of Six (G6)
- Group of Seven (G7)
- Group of Ten (G10)
- G10 currencies
- G8+5
- Special drawing rights
