= G7 =

Intergovernmental political and economic forum

- Group of Seven
(in other official languages)
German	Gruppe der Sieben
French	Groupe des sept
Italian	Gruppo dei Sette
Japanese	主要国首脳会議; Shuyōkoku Shunōkaigi
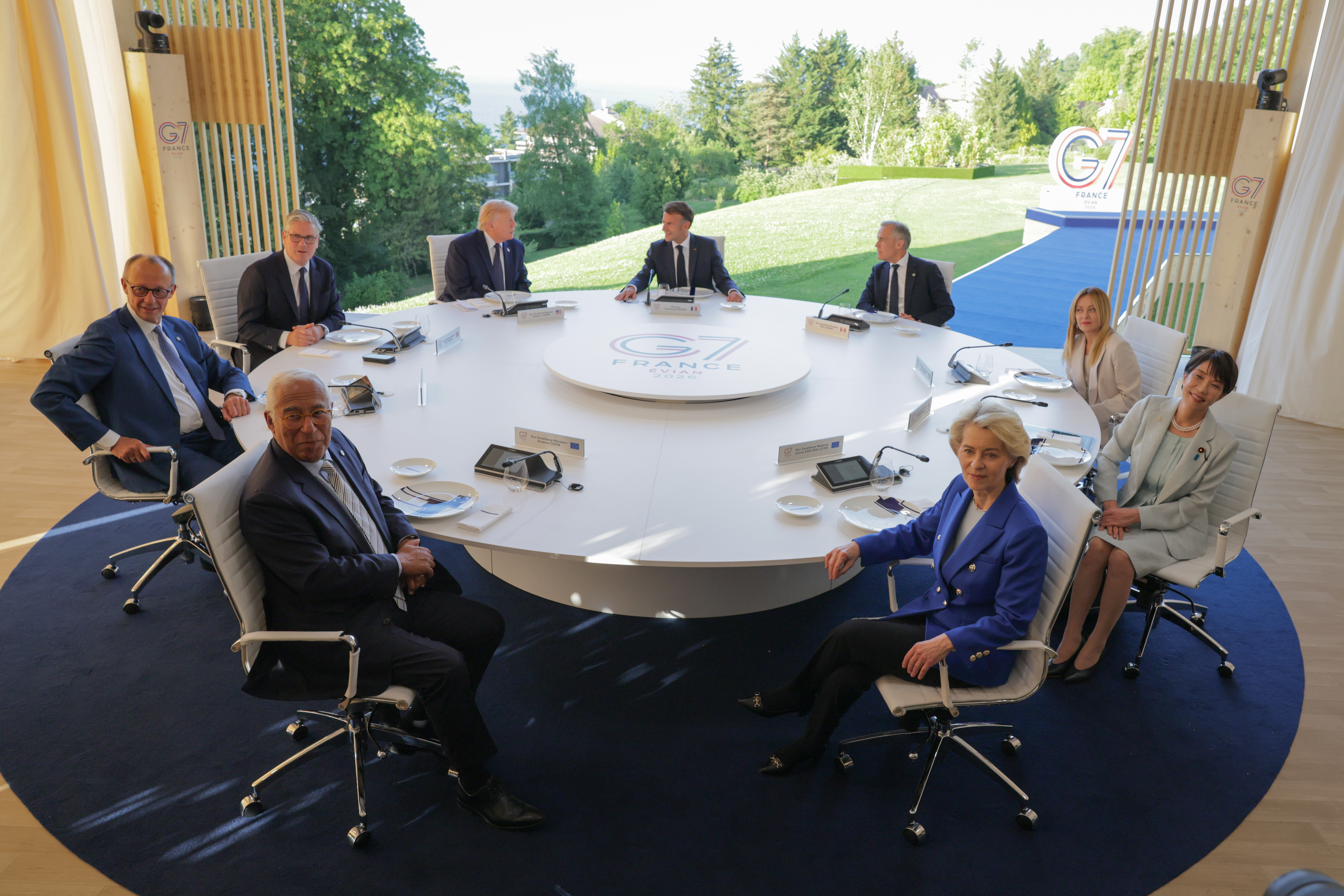
- G7 leaders in France (June 2026)

The G7-states (blue) and the EU (teal)
Member states and key leaders:
- Canada: Mark Carney, Prime Minister
- France: Emmanuel Macron, President
- Germany: Friedrich Merz, Chancellor
- Italy: Giorgia Meloni, Prime Minister
- Japan: Sanae Takaichi, Prime Minister
- United Kingdom: Andy Burnham, Prime Minister
- United States: Donald Trump, President
- European Union: António Costa, Council President; Ursula von der Leyen, Commission President
- Formation: 25 March 1973 (53 years ago); (Library Group); 15 November 1975 (51 years ago); (1st G6 summit)
- Founder: Library Group: (United States) George Shultz; (West Germany) Helmut Schmidt; (France) Valéry Giscard d'Estaing; (United Kingdom) Anthony Barber; 1st G6 summit: (United States) Gerald Ford; (France) Valéry Giscard d'Estaing; (West Germany) Helmut Schmidt; (Italy) Aldo Moro; (Japan) Takeo Miki; (United Kingdom) Harold Wilson
- Founded at: Washington, D.C. (Library Group); Rambouillet (1st G6 summit)
- Type: Intergovernmental organisation
- Purpose: Political and economic forum
- Official languages: English, French, German, Italian, Japanese
- Formerly called: Library Group; Group of Six (G6); Group of Eight (G8) (reversion)

The Group of Seven (G7) is an intergovernmental political and economic forum consisting of Canada, France, Germany, Italy, Japan, the United Kingdom and the United States; additionally, the European Union (EU) is a "non-enumerated member". It is organized around the shared values of pluralism, liberal democracy, and representative government. G7 members are major IMF advanced economies.

Originating from an ad hoc gathering of finance ministers in 1973, the G7 has since become a formal, high-profile venue for discussing and coordinating solutions to major global issues, especially in the areas of trade, security, economics, and climate change. Each member's head of government or state, along with the EU's Commission president and European Council president, meet annually at the G7 Summit; other high-ranking officials of the G7 and the EU meet throughout the year. Representatives of other states and international organizations are often invited as guests, with Russia having been a formal member (as part of the G8) from 1997 until its expulsion in 2014.

The G7 is not based on a treaty and has no permanent secretariat or office. It is organized through a presidency that rotates annually among the member states, with the presiding state setting the group's priorities and hosting the summit; France presides for 2026. While lacking a legal or institutional basis, the G7 is widely considered to wield significant international influence; it has catalyzed or spearheaded several major global initiatives, including efforts to combat the HIV/AIDS pandemic, provide financial aid to developing countries, and address climate change through the 2015 Paris Agreement. The group has been criticized by observers for its allegedly outdated and limited membership, narrow global representation, and inefficacy.

The G7 countries have together a population of about 780 million people (or almost 10% of the world population) and account for around half of worldwide nominal net wealth and as of 2026 about 44% of world nominal GDP and about 28% of world GDP by purchasing power parity.

== History ==
=== Origins ===
The concept of a forum for the capitalist world's major industrialized countries emerged before the 1973 oil crisis. On 25 March 1973, the United States secretary of the treasury, George Shultz, convened an informal gathering of finance ministers from West Germany (Helmut Schmidt), France (Valéry Giscard d'Estaing), and the United Kingdom (Anthony Barber) before an upcoming meeting in Washington, DC. United States president Richard Nixon offered the White House as a venue, and the meeting was subsequently held in its library on the ground floor; the original group of four consequently became known as the "Library Group". In mid-1973, at the Spring Meetings of the International Monetary Fund and the World Bank, Shultz proposed the addition of Japan, which all members accepted. The informal gathering of senior financial officials from the United States, United Kingdom, West Germany, Japan, and France became known as the "Group of Five".

In 1974, all five members endured sudden and often troubled changes in leadership. French president Georges Pompidou abruptly died, leading to a fresh presidential election that was closely won by Valéry Giscard d'Estaing. West German chancellor Willy Brandt, American president Richard Nixon, and Japanese prime minister Kakuei Tanaka all resigned due to scandals. In the United Kingdom, a hung election led to a minority government whose subsequent instability prompted another election the same year. Consequently, Nixon's successor, Gerald Ford, proposed a retreat the following year for the group's new leaders to learn about one another.

=== First summit and expansion ===
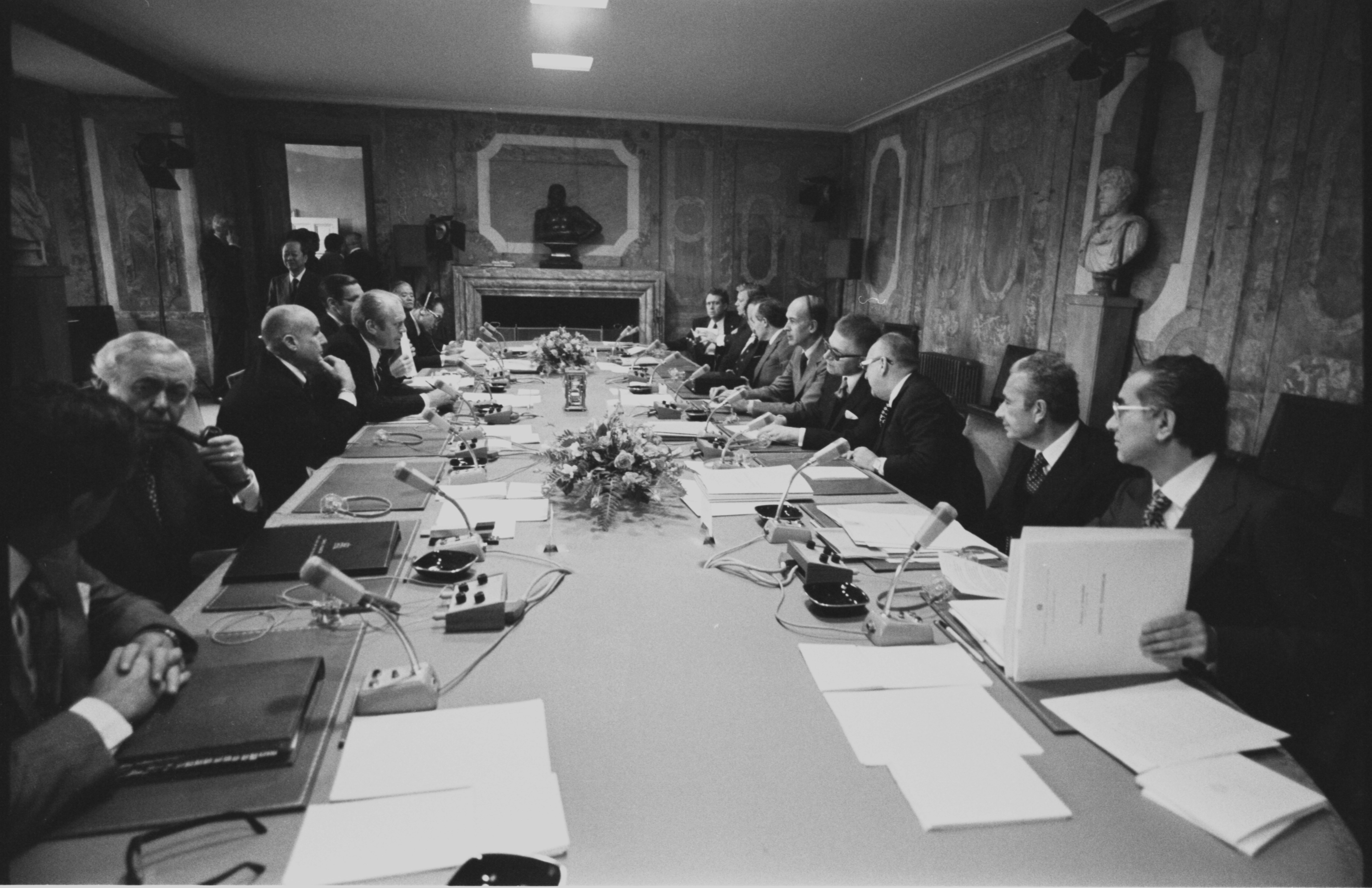
First G6 summit at the Château de Rambouillet in November 1975

At the initiative of Giscard d'Estaing and his German counterpart, Helmut Schmidt, France hosted a three-day summit in November 1975, inviting the Group of Five plus Italy, forming the "Group of Six" (G6). Taking place at the Château de Rambouillet, the meeting focused on several major economic issues, including the oil crisis, the collapse of the Bretton Woods system, and the ongoing global recession. The result was the 15-point "Declaration of Rambouillet", which, among other positions, announced the group's united commitment to promoting free trade, multilateralism, cooperation with the developing world, and rapprochement with the Eastern Bloc. The members also established plans for future gatherings to take place regularly every year.

In 1976, British prime minister Harold Wilson, who had participated in the first G6 summit, resigned from office; Schmidt and Ford believed the group needed an English speaker with more political experience, and advocated for inviting Pierre Trudeau, who had been Prime Minister of Canada for eight years – significantly longer than any G6 leader. Canada was also the next largest advanced economy after the G6 members. The summit in Dorado, Puerto Rico later that year became the first of the current Group of Seven (G7).

In 1977, the United Kingdom, which hosted that year's summit, invited the European Economic Community to join all G7 summits; beginning in 1981, it has attended every gathering through the president of the European Commission and the leader of the country holding the presidency of the Council of the European Union. Since 2009, the then-newly established position of the president of the European Council, who serves as the Union's principal foreign representative, also regularly attends the summits.

=== Rising profile ===
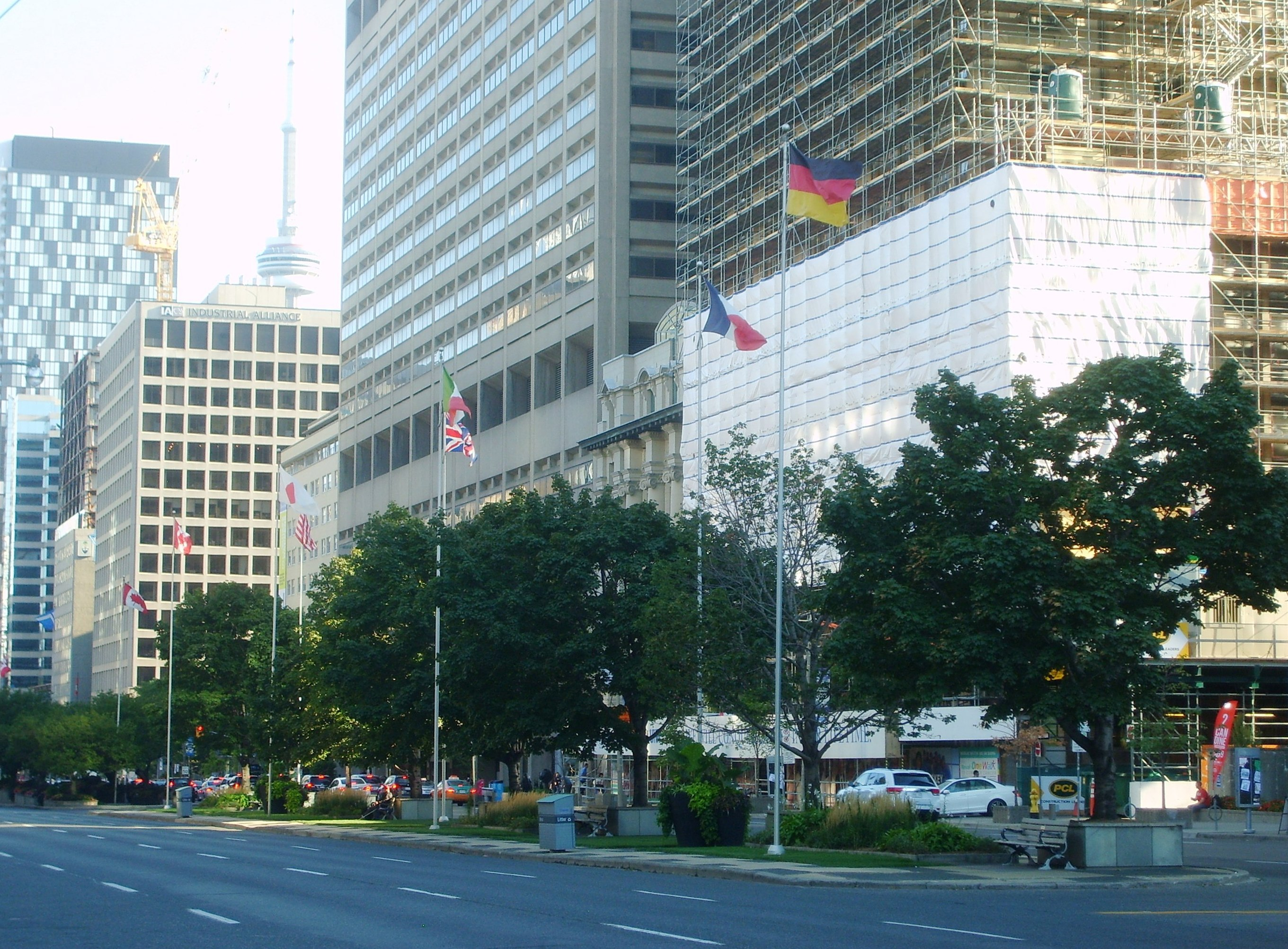
Flags of G7 members as seen on University Avenue, Toronto (September 2016)

Until the 1985 Plaza Accord, meetings between the seven governments' finance ministers were not public knowledge. The Accord, which involved only the original Group of Five, was announced the day before it was finalized, with a communiqué issued afterward. The 1980s also marked the G7's expanded concerns beyond macroeconomic issues, namely with respect to international security and conflict; for example, it sought to address the ongoing conflicts between Iran and Iraq and between the Soviet Union and Afghanistan (Afghan conflict).

Following the 1994 summit in Naples, Russian officials held separate meetings with leaders of the G7. This informal arrangement was dubbed the "Political 8" (P8), colloquially the G7+1. At the invitation of the G7 leaders, Russian president Boris Yeltsin was invited first as a guest observer, and later as a full participant. After the 1997 meeting, Russia was formally invited to the next meeting and formally joined the group in 1998, resulting in the Group of Eight (G8). Russia was an outlier in the group, as it lacked the national wealth and financial weight of other members, and had never been an established liberal democracy. Its invitation, made during a difficult transition to a post-communist economy, is believed to have been motivated by a desire to encourage its political and economic reforms and international engagement.

At the end of 1999, Vladimir Putin became Yeltsin's successor. In February 2007, Putin delivered a speech at the 43rd Munich Security Conference.

Russia's membership was suspended in March 2014 in response to its annexation of Crimea. Members stopped short of permanently ejecting the country, and in subsequent years expressed an openness or express desire to reinstate Russian participation. In January 2017, Russia announced it would permanently leave the G8, which came into effect June 2018. In 2018, U.S. president Donald Trump first advocated for Russia's return at the 2018 G7 Charlevoix summit, backed by Italian prime minister Giuseppe Conte, but all other members rejected the proposal. Trump again renewed his push in 2020, though Russia expressed no interest in returning.

== Renewed calls for expanded membership ==
There have been various proposals to expand the G7. The U.S.-based Atlantic Council has held the D-10 Strategy Forum since 2014 with representatives from what it calls "leading democracies" which support a "rules-based democratic order", consisting of all members of the G7 (including the European Union) plus Australia and South Korea. Several democratic countries – including India, Indonesia, Poland, and Spain – participate as observers. Centered around a similar mandate as the G7, the D-10 has been considered by some analysts to be an alternative to the group; This is also favored by various think tanks and former British prime minister, Boris Johnson.

In 2019 under Russian President Vladimir Putin, Russia had signaled support for the inclusion of China, India, and Turkey if the G7 had reinstated Russian membership.

In 2020 under US President Donald Trump, the U.S. had signaled support for the inclusion of Australia, Brazil, India, and South Korea, plus the reincorporation of Russia. The leaders of the other six G7 members unanimously rejected this proposal.

Also in November 2020, Jared Cohen and Richard Fontaine, writing in Foreign Affairs, suggested that the G7 might be expanded to a "T-12" of "Techno Democracies". Earlier, in June of that same year, the Global Partnership on Artificial Intelligence (GPAI) was announced. Something of a spin-out of the G7, founded by members Canada and France, GPAI's initial membership was 15, including both the EU and India, as well as Australia, Mexico, New Zealand, Singapore, Slovenia, and the Republic of Korea.

Boris Johnson invited representatives of Australia and the Republic of Korea to the June 2021 G7 summit. India was also invited to the 2021 summit, with an aim to "deepen the expertise and experience around the table" along with the other guests, according to a U.K. government statement.

In 2021, French jurist and consultant Eric Gardner de Béville, a member of the Cercle Montesquieu, proposed Spain's membership to the G7. American Chargé d'Affaires in Spain, Conrad Tribble, stated that the United States "enthusiastically supports" a "greater" role of Spanish leadership at the international level.

In April 2022, Germany confirmed that India would be invited to the G7 summit, dispelling earlier rumours that the invitation would not be extended.

In March 2023, Japan's prime minister Fumio Kishida invited South Korea, Australia, India, Indonesia, Brazil, Vietnam, the Comoros (African Union president from February 2023 to February 2024), the Cook Islands (Pacific Islands Forum president from February 2021 to May 2024) and Ukraine to the 49th summit hosted in Hiroshima.

Ronald A. Klain writing for the Carnegie Endowment, proposed creating the G9 by adding South Korea and Australia due to the Eurocentrism of the current alliance and rising challenges posed by China in Asia.

In March 2025, Prime Minister of Canada Mark Carney invited President of Ukraine Volodymyr Zelenskyy to attend the 51st G7 summit in Kananaskis, Alberta, followed by invitations for Prime Minister of Australia Anthony Albanese to attend in May and Prime Minister of India Narendra Modi to attend in June.

== Activities and initiatives ==
Host venues of G7 summits in Europe

The G7 was founded primarily to facilitate shared macroeconomic initiatives in response to contemporary economic problems; the first gathering was centered around the Nixon shock, the 1970s energy crisis, and the ensuing global recession. Since 1975, the group has met annually at summits organized and hosted by whichever country occupies the annually-rotating presidency; since 1987, the G7 Finance Ministers have met at least semi-annually, and up to four times a year at stand-alone meetings.

Beginning in the 1980s, the G7 broadened its areas of concern to include issues of international security, human rights, and global security; for example, during this period, the G7 concerned itself with the ongoing Iran–Iraq War and Soviet occupation of Afghanistan. In the 1990s, it launched a debt-relief program for the 42 heavily indebted poor countries (HIPC); provided $300 million to help build the Shelter Structure over the damaged reactor at Chernobyl; and established the Financial Stability Forum to help in "managing the international monetary system".

Host venues of G7 summits in North America

At the turn of the 21st century, the G7 began emphasizing engagement with the developing world. At the 1999 summit, the group helped launch the G20, a similar forum made up of the G7 and the next 13 largest economies (including the European Union), in order to "promote dialogue between major industrial and emerging market countries"; the G20 has been touted by some of its members as a replacement for the G7. Having previously announced a plan to cancel 90% of bilateral debt for the HIPC, totaling $100 billion, in 2005 the G7 announced debt reductions of "up to 100%" to be negotiated on a "case by case" basis.

After the 2008 financial crisis, the G7 met twice in Washington, D.C. in 2008 and in Rome in February 2009. G7 finance ministers pledged to take "all necessary steps" to stem the crisis, devising an "aggressive action plan" that included providing publicly funded capital infusions to banks in danger of failing. Some analysts criticized the group for seemingly advocating that individual governments develop individual responses to the recession, rather than cohere around a united effort.

Host venues of G7 summits in Japan

In subsequent years, the G7 has faced several geopolitical challenges that have led some international analysts to question its credibility, or propose its replacement by the G20. On 2 March 2014, the G7 condemned the Russian Federation for its "violation of the sovereignty and territorial integrity of Ukraine" through its military intervention. The group also announced its commitment to "mobilize rapid technical assistance to support Ukraine in addressing its macroeconomic, regulatory and anti-corruption challenges", while adding that the International Monetary Fund (IMF) was best suited to stabilizing the country's finances and economy.

In response to Russia's subsequent annexation of Crimea, on 24 March the G7 convened an emergency meeting at the official residence of the prime minister of the Netherlands, the Catshuis in The Hague; this location was chosen because all G7 leaders were already present to attend the 2014 Nuclear Security Summit hosted by the Netherlands. This was the first G7 meeting neither taking place in a member state nor having the host leader participating in the meeting. The upcoming G8 summit in Sochi, Russia was moved to Brussels, where the EU was the host. On 5 June 2014 the G7 condemned Moscow for its "continuing violation" of Ukraine's sovereignty and stated they were prepared to impose further sanctions on Russia. This meeting was the first since Russia was suspended from the G8, and subsequently it has not been involved in any G7 summit.

The G7 has continued to take a strong stance against Russia's "destabilising behaviour and malign activities" in Ukraine and elsewhere around the world, following the joint communique from the June 2021 summit in the U.K. The group also called on Russia to address international cybercrime attacks launched from within its borders, and to investigate the use of chemical weapons on Russian opposition leader Alexei Navalny. The June 2021 summit also saw the G7 commit to helping the world recover from the global COVID-19 pandemic (including plans to help vaccinate the entire world); encourage further action against climate change and biodiversity loss; and promote "shared values" of pluralism and democracy.

In 2022, G7 leaders were invited to attend an extraordinary summit of NATO called in response to the 2022 Russian invasion of Ukraine.

In April 2024, the G7 energy ministers agreed to phase out unabated coal-fired power generation between 2030 and 2035, or on a timeline that is consistent with limiting global warming to 1.5 °C.

=== 2019 Amazon rainforest fires and Brazil ===
The G7 nations pledged US$20 million to help Brazil and other countries in South America fight the wildfires. This money was welcomed, although it was widely seen as a "relatively small amount" given the scale of the problem. Macron threatened to block a major trade deal between the European Union and Brazil (Mercosur) that would benefit the agricultural interests accused of driving deforestation. Soon after, Germany and the United Kingdom criticized the threat.

=== Summit organization ===
The annual G7 summit is attended by each member's head of government. The member country holding the G7 presidency is responsible for organizing and hosting the year's summit. The serial annual summits can be parsed chronologically in arguably distinct ways, including as the sequence of host countries for the summits has recurred over time and series. Generally every country hosts the summit once every seven years.

Besides a main meeting in June or July, a number of other meetings may take place throughout the year; in 2021 for example, seven tracks existed for finance (4–5 June 2021), environmental (20 and 21 May 2021), health (3–4 June 2021), trade (27–28 May 2021), interior (7–9 September 2021) digital and technology (28–29 April 2021), development (3–5 May 2021) and foreign ministers.

==== Friction with the United States ====
The 2018 meeting in Charlevoix, Canada, was marred by fractious negotiations concerning tariffs and Donald Trump's position that Russia should be reinstated to the G7. The Trump administration had just imposed steel and aluminium tariffs on many countries, including European countries that are fellow members of the G7, and Canada, the host country for the 2018 meeting. Trump expressed dismay at Canadian Prime Minister Justin Trudeau for holding a press conference in which Canada restated its position on tariffs (a public criticism of Trump's economic policy), and directed his representatives at the meeting not to sign the economic section of the joint communiqué that is typically issued at the conclusion of the meeting. German Chancellor Angela Merkel described Trump's behaviour as a "depressing withdrawal", while French President Emmanuel Macron invited him "to be serious". In the final statement signed by all members except the US, the G7 announced its intention to recall sanctions and to be ready to take further restrictive measures within the next months against the Russian Federation for its failure to completely implement the Minsk Agreement.

==== Twelve-Day War ====
The G7 countries expressed support for Israel in the Twelve-Day War. On 16 June 2025, G7 leaders said in a statement: "We affirm that Israel has a right to defend itself. We reiterate our support for Israel's security. Iran is the principal source of regional instability and terror." On 22 March 2026, the foreign ministers of G7 condemned Iran's "unjustifiable" and "reckless" attacks on sites in the Gulf region.

== List of summits ==
Overview of G7 summits
#	Date	Host	Host leader	Location held	Notes
As the G6
1st	15–17 November 1975	France	Valéry Giscard d'Estaing	Château de Rambouillet in Rambouillet, Yvelines	The first and only G6 summit.
As the G7
2nd	27–28 June 1976	United States	Gerald R. Ford	Dorado Beach Hotel in Dorado, Puerto Rico	Also called "Rambouillet II". Canada joined the group, forming the G7.
3rd	7–8 May 1977	United Kingdom	James Callaghan	10 Downing Street, London, England	The president of the European Commission was invited to join the annual G7 summits.
4th	16–17 July 1978	West Germany	Helmut Schmidt	Palais Schaumburg in Bonn, North Rhine-Westphalia	
5th	28–29 June 1979	Japan	Masayoshi Ōhira	Akasaka Palace in Minato, Tokyo	
6th	22–23 June 1980	Italy	Francesco Cossiga	San Giorgio Maggiore in Venice, Veneto	Prime Minister Ōhira died in office on 12 June; Foreign Minister Saburō Ōkita led the delegation that represented Japan.
7th	20–21 July 1981	Canada	Pierre Trudeau	Château Montebello in Montebello, Québec	
8th	4–6 June 1982	France	François Mitterrand	Palace of Versailles in Versailles, Yvelines	
9th	28–29 May 1983	United States	Ronald Reagan	Colonial Capitol in Williamsburg, Virginia	
10th	7–9 June 1984	United Kingdom	Margaret Thatcher	Lancaster House in London, England	
11th	2–4 May 1985	West Germany	Helmut Kohl	Palais Schaumburg in Bonn, North Rhine-Westphalia	
12th	4–6 May 1986	Japan	Yasuhiro Nakasone	Akasaka Palace in Minato, Tokyo	
13th	8–10 June 1987	Italy	Amintore Fanfani	San Giorgio Maggiore in Venice, Veneto	
14th	19–20 June 1988	Canada	Brian Mulroney	Metro Toronto Convention Centre in Toronto, Ontario	
15th	14–16 July 1989	France	François Mitterrand	Grande Arche in Puteaux, Hauts-de-Seine	The Financial Action Task Force (FATF) was formed.
16th	9–11 July 1990	United States	George H. W. Bush	Rice University and Museum of Fine Arts in Houston, Texas	
17th	15–17 July 1991	United Kingdom	John Major	Lancaster House in London, England	
18th	6–8 July 1992	Germany	Helmut Kohl	Residenz in Munich, Bavaria	The first G7 summit in reunified Germany.
19th	7–9 July 1993	Japan	Kiichi Miyazawa	Akasaka Palace in Minato, Tokyo	
20th	8–10 July 1994	Italy	Silvio Berlusconi	Royal Palace in Naples, Campania	
21st	15–17 June 1995	Canada	Jean Chrétien	Summit Place in Halifax, Nova Scotia	
22nd	27–29 June 1996	France	Jacques Chirac	Musée d'art contemporain in Lyon, Auvergne-Rhône-Alpes	The first summit to debut international organizations, namely the United Nations, World Bank, International Monetary Fund, and the World Trade Organization.
As the G8
23rd	20–22 June 1997	United States	Bill Clinton	Public Library in Denver, Colorado	Russia joined the group, forming the G8.
24th	15–17 May 1998	United Kingdom	Tony Blair	International Convention Centre in Birmingham, West Midlands	
25th	18–20 June 1999	Germany	Gerhard Schröder	Museum Ludwig in Cologne, North Rhine-Westphalia	The first summit of the G20 major economies at Berlin.
26th	21–23 July 2000	Japan	Yoshirō Mori	Bankoku Shinryokan in Nago, Okinawa	South Africa was invited to the summit for the first time, and was thereafter invited annually without interruption until the 38th G8 summit in 2012. With permission from a G8 leader, other nations were invited to the summit on a periodical basis for the first time. Nigeria, Algeria, and Senegal accepted their invitations here. The World Health Organization was also invited for the first time.
27th	20–22 July 2001	Italy	Silvio Berlusconi	Doge's Palace in Genoa, Liguria	Leaders from Bangladesh, Mali, and El Salvador accepted their invitations here. Demonstrator Carlo Giuliani was shot and killed by the Carabinieri during a violent demonstration. One of the largest and most violent anti-globalization movement protests occurred during the summit. Following those events and the 11 September attacks two months later in 2001, the summits have been held at more remote locations.
28th	26–27 June 2002	Canada	Jean Chrétien	Kananaskis Resort in Kananaskis, Alberta	Russia gained permission to officially host a G8 Summit. This was the first Kananaskis G7/G8 Summit; the area hosted it again in 2025.
29th	1–3 June 2003	France	Jacques Chirac	Hôtel Royal in Évian-les-Bains, Haute-Savoie	The G8+5 was unofficially formed when China, India, Brazil, and Mexico were invited to this summit for the first time (the other member of the +5 was South Africa). Other first-time nations that were invited by the French president included Egypt, Morocco, Saudi Arabia, Malaysia, and Switzerland. This was the first Évian-les-Bains G7/G8 Summit; the area will host it again in 2026.
30th	8–10 June 2004	United States	George W. Bush	Sea Island Resort in Sea Island, Georgia	A record number of leaders from 12 different nations accepted their invitations here. Amongst a couple of veteran nations, the others were: Ghana, Afghanistan, Bahrain, Iraq, Jordan, Turkey, Yemen, and Uganda. The state funeral of former President Ronald Reagan took place in Washington during the summit. Many of the G8 leaders attended this funeral, along with 20 other heads of state.
31st	6–8 July 2005	United Kingdom	Tony Blair	Gleneagles Hotel in Auchterarder, Scotland	The G8+5 was officially formed. On the second day of the meeting, suicide bombers killed 52 people on the London Underground and a bus. Ethiopia and Tanzania were invited for the first time. The African Union and the International Energy Agency made their debut here. 225,000 people took to the streets of Edinburgh as part of the Make Poverty History campaign calling for Trade Justice, Debt Relief and Better Aid. Numerous other demonstrations also took place challenging the legitimacy of the G8.
32nd	15–17 July 2006	Russia (G8 member, not G7)	Vladimir Putin	Constantine Palace in Strelna, Saint Petersburg	The only G8 summit held in Russia. The International Atomic Energy Agency and UNESCO made their debut here.
33rd	6–8 June 2007	Germany	Angela Merkel	Grand Hotel Heiligendamm in Bad Doberan, Mecklenburg-Western Pomerania	Seven different international organizations accepted their invitations to this summit. The Organisation for Economic Co-operation and Development and the Commonwealth of Independent States made their debut here.
34th	7–9 July 2008	Japan	Yasuo Fukuda	The Windsor Hotel Toya Resort & Spa in Tōyako, Hokkaido	Australia, Indonesia, and South Korea accepted their G8 summit invitations for the first time.
35th	8–10 July 2009	Italy	Silvio Berlusconi	Scuola ispettori e sovrintendenti della Guardia di Finanza in L'Aquila, Abruzzo	This G8 summit was originally planned to be held in La Maddalena (Sardinia), but was moved to L'Aquila as a way of showing Prime Minister Berlusconi's desire to help the region after the 2009 L'Aquila earthquake. With 15 invited countries, it was the most heavily attended summit in the history of the group. Angola, Denmark, Netherlands, and Spain accepted their invitations for the first time. A record of 11 international organizations were represented in this summit. For the first time, the Food and Agriculture Organization, the International Fund for Agricultural Development, the World Food Programme, and the International Labour Organization accepted their invitations.
36th	25–26 June 2010	Canada	Stephen Harper	Deerhurst Resort in Huntsville, Ontario	Malawi, Colombia, Haiti, and Jamaica accepted their invitations for the first time.
37th	26–27 May 2011	France	Nicolas Sarkozy	Centre International in Deauville, Calvados	Guinea, Niger, Côte d'Ivoire, and Tunisia accepted their invitations for the first time. The League of Arab States made its debut in the meeting.
38th	18–19 May 2012	United States	Barack Obama	Camp David near Thurmont, Maryland	The summit was originally planned for Chicago, along with the NATO summit, but on 5 March 2012 an official announcement was made that the summit would be held at the more private location of Camp David, and starting one day earlier than previously scheduled. The second summit in which one of the leaders, in this case Vladimir Putin, declined to participate. The summit concentrated on the core leaders only, as no non-G8 leaders or international organizations were invited.
39th	17–18 June 2013	United Kingdom	David Cameron	Lough Erne Resort in Enniskillen, Northern Ireland	As in 2012, only the core members of the G8 attended this meeting. The four main topics that were discussed here were trade, government transparency, tackling tax evasion, and the ongoing Syrian crisis.
As the G7
40th	4–5 June 2014	European Union	Herman Van Rompuy; José Manuel Barroso	Justus Lipsius building in Brussels, Belgium	This summit was originally planned to be held in Sochi, Russia, but was relocated, with Russia disinvited, due to the latter's annexation of Crimea. Thus, the grouping reverted from G8 back to G7. (There was an emergency meeting in March 2014 in The Hague.)
41st	7–8 June 2015	Germany	Angela Merkel	Schloss Elmau in Krün, Bavaria	The summit was focused on the global economy, as well as on key issues regarding foreign, security, and development policy. The Global Apollo Programme was also on the agenda.
42nd	26–27 May 2016	Japan	Shinzō Abe	Shima Kanko Hotel in Shima, Mie	The G7 leaders aimed to address challenges affecting the growth of the world economy, like slowdowns in emerging markets and drops in price of oil. The G7 also issued a warning to the United Kingdom that "a UK exit from the EU would reverse the trend towards greater global trade and investment, and the jobs they create and is a further serious risk to growth." Commitment to an EU–Japan Free Trade Agreement.
43rd	26–27 May 2017	Italy	Paolo Gentiloni	Palazzo dei Congressi in Taormina, Sicily	The Host leader was the prime minister of Italy, originally Matteo Renzi. He formally resigned on 12 December 2016. The G7 leaders emphasized common endeavours: ending the Syrian crisis, fulfilling the UN mission in Libya, and reducing the presence of ISIS in Syria and Iraq. North Korea was urged to comply with UN resolutions, and Russian responsibility for the Russo-Ukrainian War was stressed. Supporting economic activity and ensuring price stability was demanded, while inequalities in trade and gender were called to be challenged. It was agreed to help countries in creating conditions that address the drivers of migration: ending hunger, increasing competitiveness, and advancing global health security.
44th	8–9 June 2018	Canada	Justin Trudeau	Manoir Richelieu in La Malbaie, Québec (Charlevoix)	The summit took place at the Manoir Richelieu. Prime Minister Trudeau announced five themes for Canada's G7 presidency, which began in January 2018. Climate, along with commerce trades, was one of the main themes. "Working together on climate change, oceans and clean energy." The final statement contained 28 points. US president Donald Trump did not agree to the economic section of the final statement. The G7 members also announced to recall sanctions and to be ready to take further restrictive measures against Russian Federation for its failure to implement the Minsk Protocol completely.
45th	24–26 August 2019	France	Emmanuel Macron	Hôtel du Palais in Biarritz, Pyrénées-Atlantiques	It was agreed at the summit that the World Trade Organization, "with regard to intellectual property protection, to settle disputes more swiftly and to eliminate unfair trade practices", "to simplify regulatory barriers and modernize international taxation within the framework of the OECD", "to ensure that Iran never acquires nuclear weapons and to foster peace and stability in the region", and "to support a truce in Libya that will lead to a long-term ceasefire". The summit also addressed the Russian military intervention in Ukraine and the 2019 Hong Kong anti-extradition bill protests.
46th	Cancelled	United States (original host, none)	Donald Trump (original host figure)	Camp David near Thurmont, Maryland (cancelled)	The summit was originally to be held in Camp David, Maryland, but was officially postponed on 19 March 2020 due to the concerns over the worldwide coronavirus pandemic, and was planned to be replaced by a global videoconference. In the end though, no meeting was ever held.
47th	11–13 June 2021	United Kingdom	Boris Johnson	Carbis Bay Estate in Carbis Bay, Cornwall	The summit reached provisional agreement on a global minimum corporate tax rate of 15%.
48th	26–28 June 2022	Germany	Olaf Scholz	Schloss Elmau in Krün, Bavaria	Discussed with Ukrainian president Volodymyr Zelenskyy virtually, and the statement on support for Ukraine was issued. Also discussed with invited guests about global food security, gender equality and "Investing in a Better Future" on climate, energy and health, and G7 Leaders' Communiqué was issued after the summit meetings.
49th	19–21 May 2023	Japan	Fumio Kishida	Grand Prince Hotel in Hiroshima, Hiroshima Prefecture	At the situation of the world facing multiple crises, including Russian invasion of Ukraine, climate crisis, pandemics, and geopolitical crisis, the G7 discussed to counter these crisis. The G7 affirmed to uphold "the free and open international order" based on "the rule of law", and strengthened the G7's outreach to the emerging and developing countries. The long guest list reflects the attempts to woo what many call the "Global South", a term used for developing countries in Asia, Africa and Latin America, all of whom have complex political and economic ties to both Russia and China. President of Ukraine Volodymyr Zelenskyy attended two sessions as guest and got a lot of attention.
50th	13–15 June 2024	Italy	Giorgia Meloni	Borgo Egnazia in Fasano, Apulia	The 50th G7 summit hosted many guest international leaders representing Nations and International organizations such as the UN, IMF, and the World Bank. The summit also hosted Pope Francis of the Vatican in his first appearance at a G7 Summit. The Summit also hosted President Zelenskyy of Ukraine for the 3rd year since the 2022 Russian invasion of Ukraine. The Argentine president and the Indian prime minister also attended the summit. The topics discussed included the ongoing war in Ukraine, the Gaza War, climate change, China, Migration, and the Economy.
51st	16–17 June 2025	Canada	Mark Carney	Kananaskis Resort in Kananaskis, Alberta	The summit took place days after the outbreak of the Twelve-Day War, with all leaders signing a statement calling for deescalation. Several bilateral agreements were announced including increased Canadian military support for Ukraine and provisions of a trade deal between the UK and US. United States President Donald Trump expressed that it was wrong for the group to have expelled Russia, something he last mentioned at the 45th summit, and later left the summit a day early to deal with the Twelve-Day War.
52nd	15–17 June 2026	France	Emmanuel Macron	Hôtel Royal in Évian-les-Bains, Haute-Savoie	During at this summit, the G7 leaders issued joint statements on support for Ukraine, global economic imbalances, critical minerals, and other international issues like the Iran War.
53rd	TBA	United States	Donald Trump	TBA	

== Current leaders ==
(Canada) Canada
Mark Carney, Prime Minister

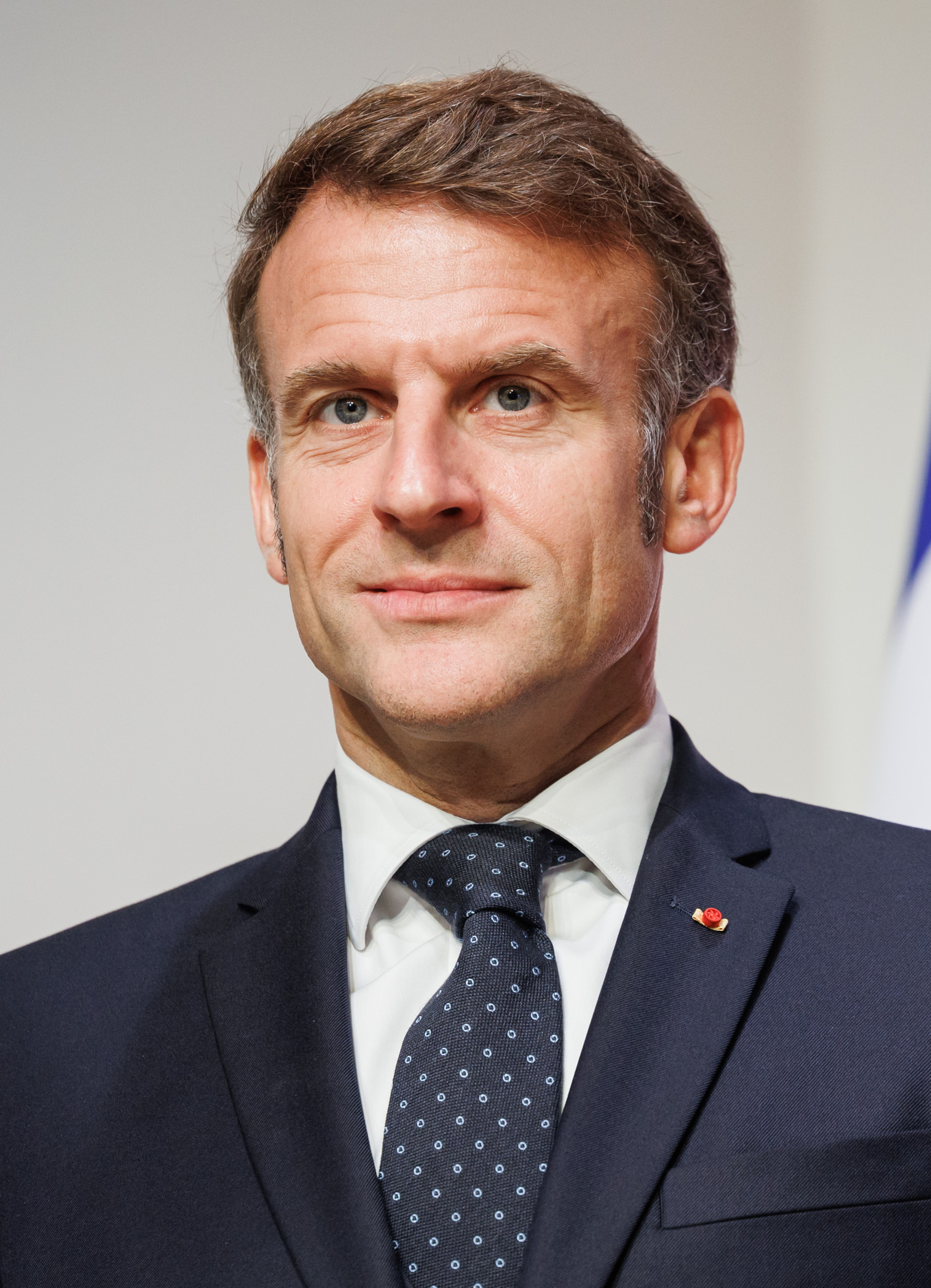
(France) France
Emmanuel Macron, President (host)

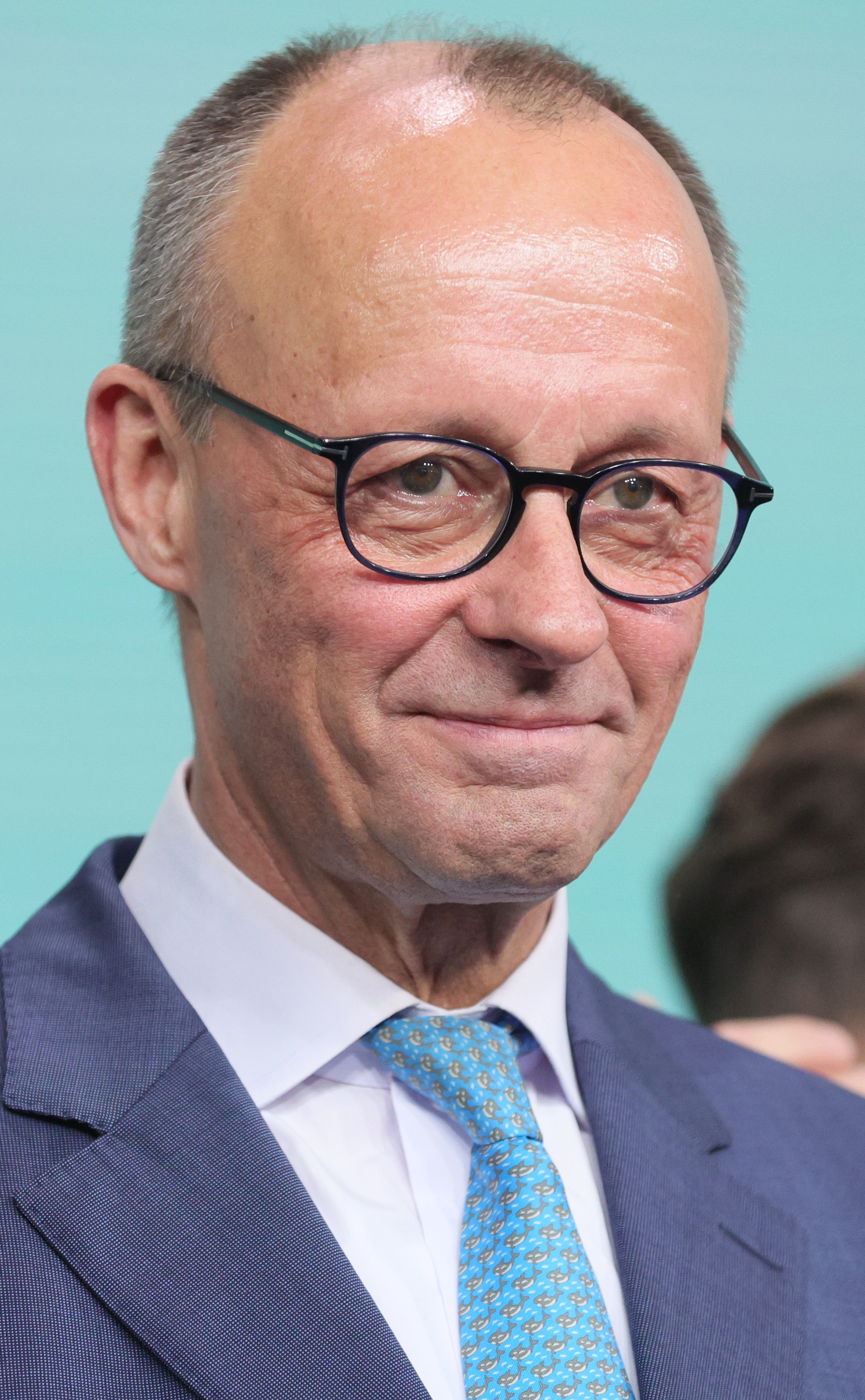
(Germany) Germany
Friedrich Merz, Chancellor

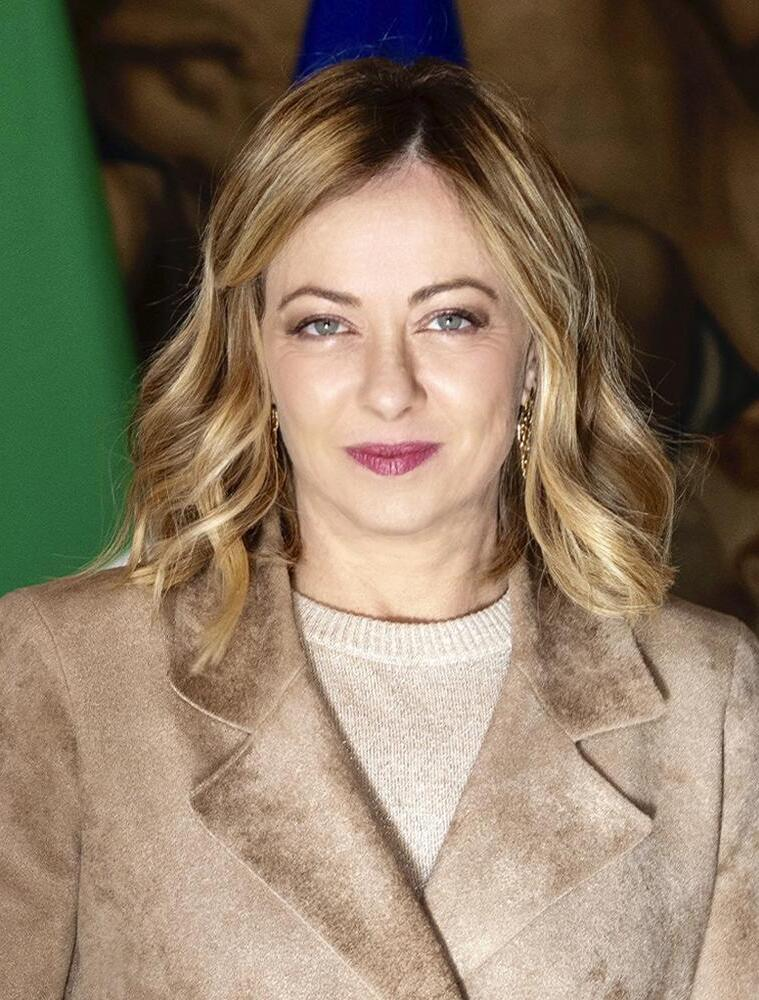
(Italy) Italy
Giorgia Meloni, Prime Minister

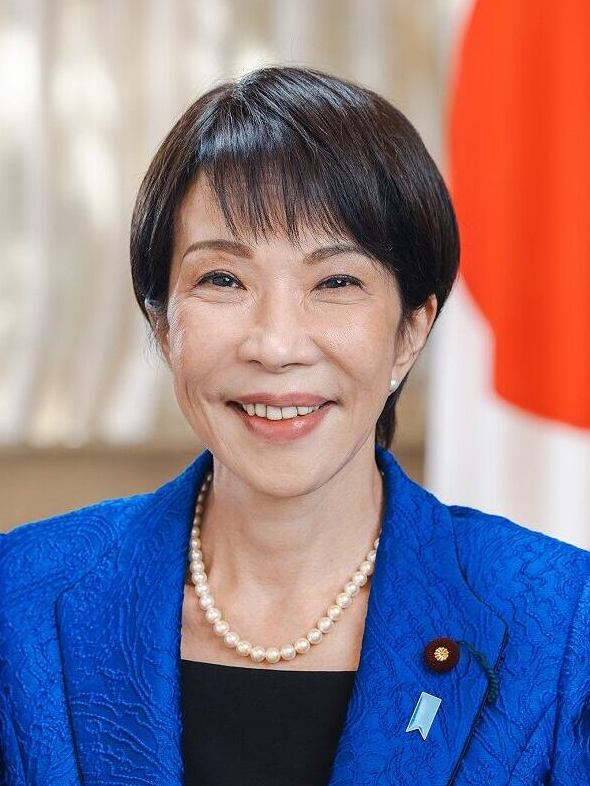
(Japan) Japan
Sanae Takaichi, Prime Minister

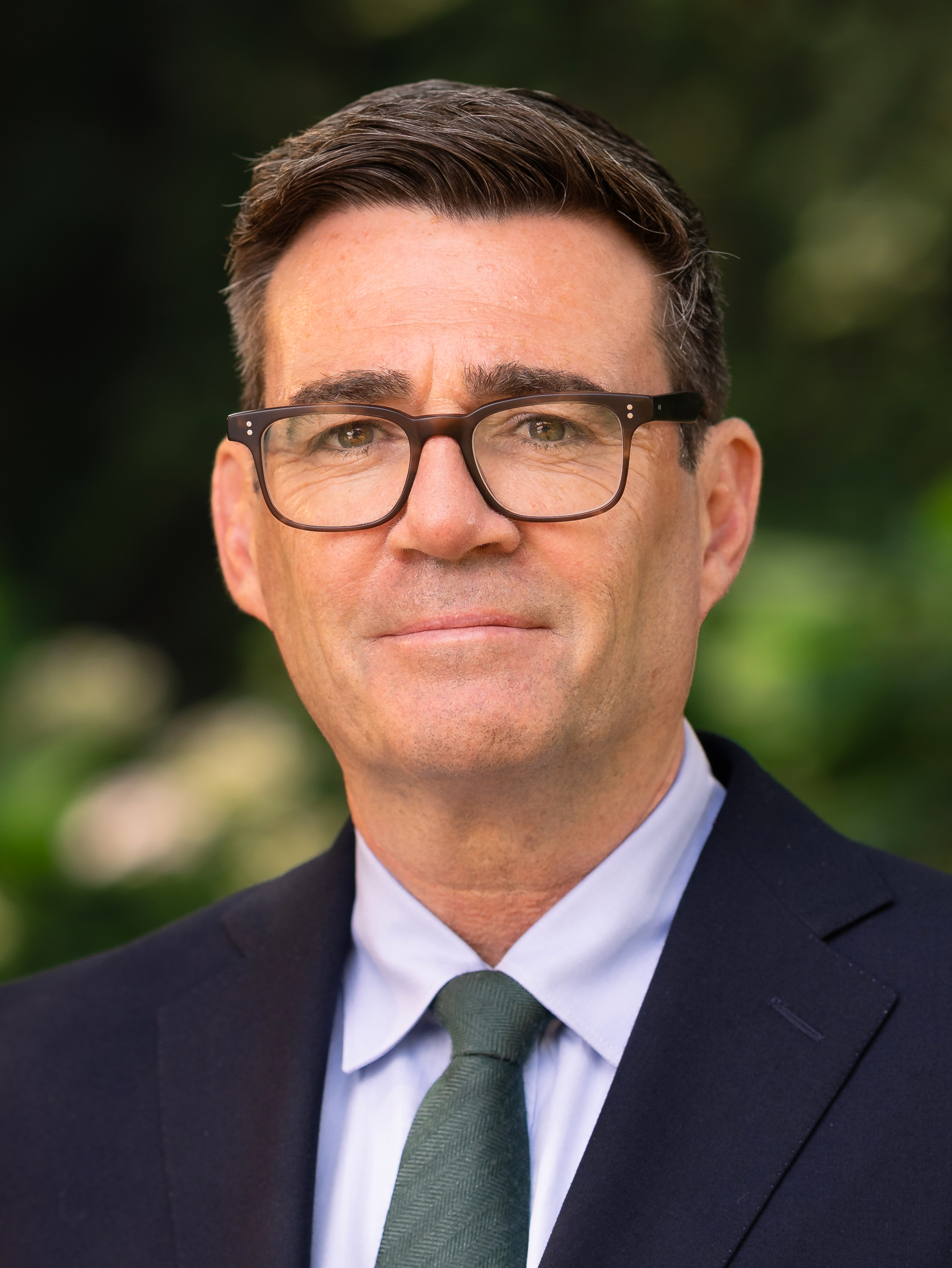
(United Kingdom) United Kingdom
Andy Burnham, Prime Minister

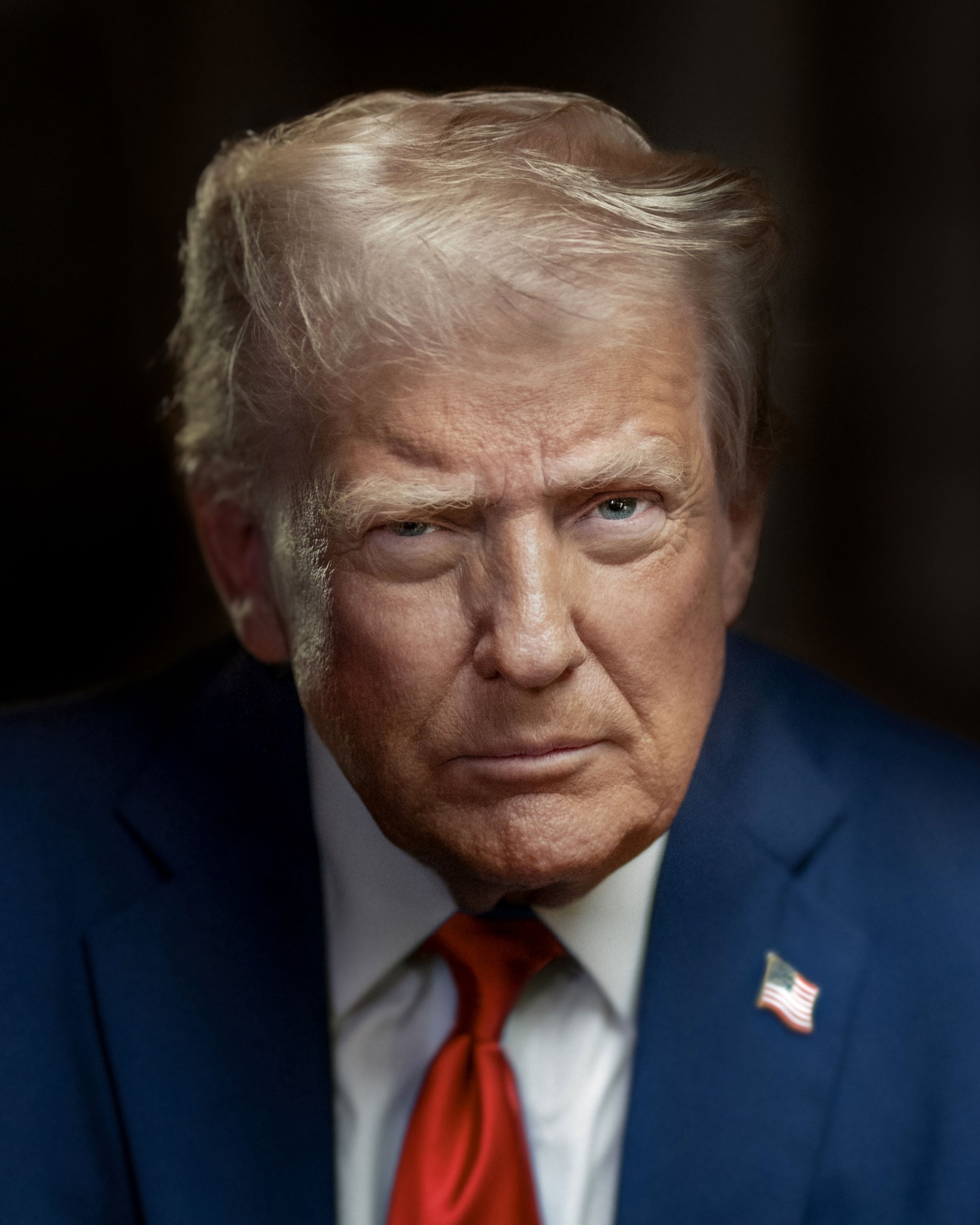
(United States) United States
Donald Trump, President
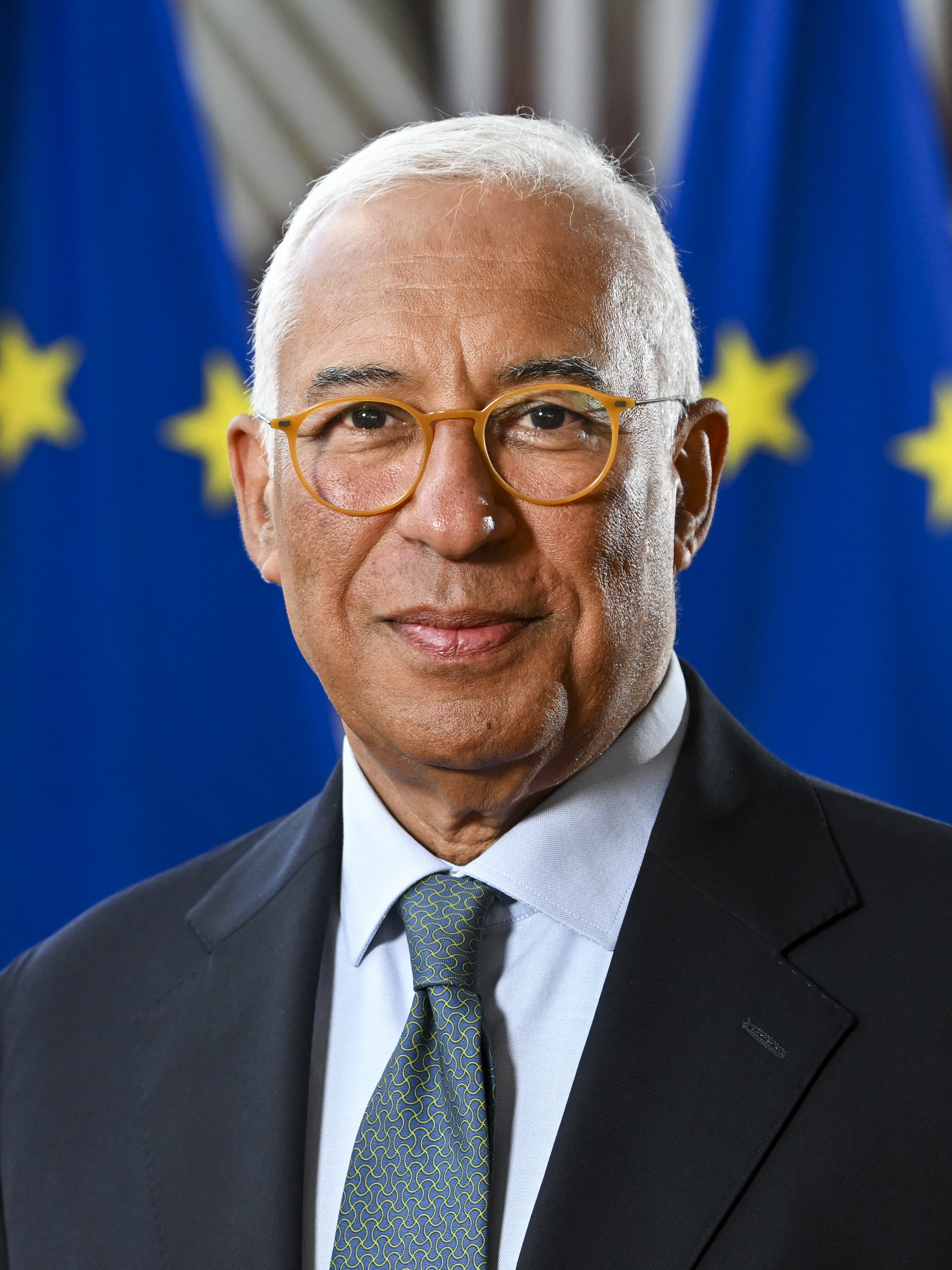
(European Union) European Union
António Costa, President of the European Council

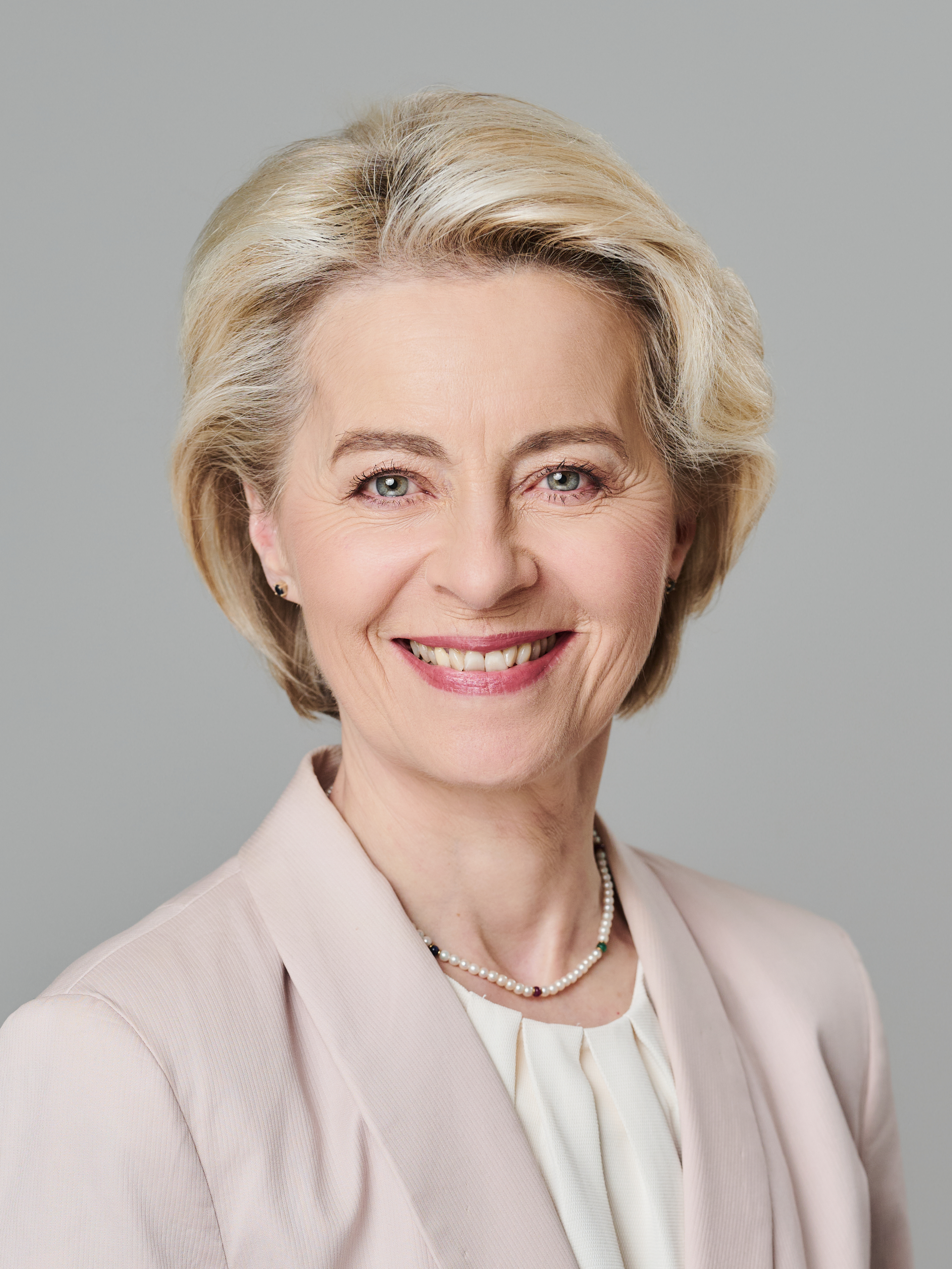
(European Union) European Union
Ursula von der Leyen, President of the European Commission

Leaders of G7 members
Member	Leader(s)		Minister of Finance		Central Bank Governor		Minister of Foreign Affairs	
Canada	Prime Minister	Mark Carney	Minister of Finance	François-Philippe Champagne	Governor	Tiff Macklem	Minister of Foreign Affairs	Anita Anand
France	President	Emmanuel Macron	Minister of the Economy and Finance	Roland Lescure	Governor	Emmanuel Moulin	Minister of Europe and Foreign Affairs	Jean-Noël Barrot
Germany	Chancellor	Friedrich Merz	Minister of Finance	Lars Klingbeil	President	Joachim Nagel	Minister of Foreign Affairs	Johann Wadephul
Italy	Prime Minister	Giorgia Meloni	Minister of Economy and Finance	Giancarlo Giorgetti	Governor	Fabio Panetta	Minister of Foreign Affairs	Antonio Tajani
Japan	Prime Minister	Sanae Takaichi	Minister of Finance	Satsuki Katayama	Governor	Kazuo Ueda	Minister of Foreign Affairs	Toshimitsu Motegi
United Kingdom	Prime Minister	Andy Burnham	Chancellor of the Exchequer	John Healey	Governor	Andrew Bailey	Foreign Secretary	Ed Miliband
United States	President	Donald Trump	Secretary of the Treasury	Scott Bessent	Chair	Kevin Warsh	Secretary of State	Marco Rubio
European Union	Council President	António Costa	Commissioner for Economy	Valdis Dombrovskis	President	Christine Lagarde	High Representative for Foreign Affairs and Security Policy	Kaja Kallas
European Union	Commission President	Ursula von der Leyen	Commissioner for Economy	Valdis Dombrovskis	President	Christine Lagarde	High Representative for Foreign Affairs and Security Policy	Kaja Kallas

== Member country data ==
The G7 is composed of the seven wealthiest advanced countries. The People's Republic of China, according to its data, would be the second-largest with 17.90% of the world net wealth, but is excluded because of its relatively low net wealth per adult and Human Development Index. As of 2021, Crédit Suisse reports the G7 (without the European Union) represents around 53% of the global net wealth; including the EU, the G7 accounts for over 60% of the global net wealth. The combined population of the G7 countries is about 10% of world population.

Overview of G7 members
Member	Trade ($ billion, 2025)	Nominal GDP ($ million, 2026)	PPP GDP (Int$ million, 2026)	Nominal GDP per capita ($, 2026)	PPP GDP per capita (Int$, 2026)	HDI (2023)	Population (2026)	P5	OECD	DAC	OIF	C'wth	NATO	Economic classification (IMF)	Currency
Canada	1,654	2,490,256	2,915,715	60,105	70,374	0.939	40,467,728	No	Yes	Yes	Yes	Yes	Yes	Advanced	Canadian dollar
France	2,654	3,554,155	4,756,703	51,448	68,852	0.920	66,746,401	Yes	Yes	Yes	Yes	No	Yes	Advanced	Euro
Germany	5,002	5,471,299	6,550,995	65,699	78,664	0.959	83,644,258	No	Yes	Yes	No	No	Yes	Advanced	Euro
Italy	1,896	2,701,737	3,898,990	45,886	65,761	0.915	58,926,166	No	Yes	Yes	No	No	Yes	Advanced	Euro
Japan	2,302	4,341,986	7,324,055	35,399	59,712	0.925	122,427,731	No	Yes	Yes	No	No	global partner	Advanced	Yen
United Kingdom	3,494	4,268,446	4,783,102	61,108	68,476	0.946	69,931,528	Yes	Yes	Yes	No	Yes	Yes	Advanced	Pound
United States	9,076	32,642,373	32,642,373	95,212	95,212	0.938	349,035,494	Yes	Yes	Yes	No	No	Yes	Advanced	US dollar
European Union	9,189	22,806,152	30,923,605	50,521	68,514	0.915 (Note: average of all EU member states)	447,890,473	No	participating partner	Yes	No	No	No	Advanced / Emerging and Developing	Euro
Total (excl. EU)	26,078	55,470,253	62,871,633	59,341	71,758	0.934	777,264,934								

== Reception ==
According to the group hegemony theory, the G7 has helped stabilise and perpetuate an inequitable world economic order.

=== 2003 protests ===
The 2003 G8 summit held in Évian-les-Bains, France, also sparked violent protests in Geneva, accompanied by widespread looting of stores and tens of millions of euros in damage.

=== 2015 protests ===
About 7,500 protesters led by the group 'Stop-G7' demonstrated during the 2015 summit in Bavaria, Germany. About 300 of those reached the 3 m high and 7 km long security fence surrounding the summit location. The protesters questioned the legitimacy of the G7 to make decisions that could affect the whole world. Authorities had banned demonstrations in the area closest to the summit location and 20,000 police were on duty in Southern Bavaria to keep activists and protesters from interfering with the summit.

=== China ===
In June 2024, the G7 issued a statement criticizing China for "enabling" the Russian invasion of Ukraine and threatening sanctions. China's foreign ministry criticized the G7 statement. In March 2025, China's foreign ministry criticized the G7 for a statement that raised concerns about China's nuclear buildup, maritime actions in the South China Sea, and market policies. In 2026, China said that "the G7 should serve as a catalyst for solidarity and cooperation rather than an amplifier of division and confrontation." Associated Press commented that "China’s exclusion from the informal club’s summits also looks odd, given its now immense sway over the world’s economic well-being and affairs", while also noting that "an unwritten G7 rule has always been that it’s only for democracies" and worries that China's membership could damage G7's cohesion.

== See also ==
- Partnership for Global Infrastructure and Investment
- Capitalism
- D-10 Strategy Forum
- Developed country
- G4 (EU)
- G6 (EU)
- G8
- G8+5
- G10 currencies
- G20
- Great power
- Group of Twelve (G12)
- Junior 8
- List of country groupings
- List of G7 leaders
- List of multilateral free trade agreements
- OECD
- Quint
- BRICS
- MIKTA

=== Relations between G7 countries ===
- Canada–France relations
- Canada–Germany relations
- Canada–Italy relations
- Canada–Japan relations
- Canada–United Kingdom relations
- Canada–United States relations
- France–Germany relations
- France–Italy relations
- France–Japan relations
- France–United Kingdom relations
- France–United States relations
- Germany–Italy relations
- Germany–Japan relations
- Germany–United Kingdom relations
- Germany–United States relations
- Italy–Japan relations
- Italy–United Kingdom relations
- Italy–United States relations
- Japan–United Kingdom relations
- Japan–United States relations
- United Kingdom–United States relations
- Canada–European Union relations
- Japan–European Union relations
- United Kingdom–European Union relations
- United States–European Union relations
