= European Union and the G7 =

Relationship overview

The European Union (EU) is a member of the G7 (the G8, until Russia left the organization in 2014). It has been dubbed its "8th member", holds all the privileges and obligations of membership but without the right to host or chair a summit. As the full name of the G7 is the "Group of Seven Nations", the EU has not been included in the number, hence there being eight members in the G7.

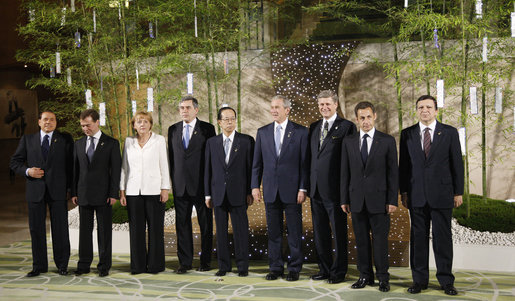
The Commission President with the eight other leaders at the 34th G8 summit in 2008

The president of the European Commission has attended since he was first invited to the third G7 summit in 1977, Roy Jenkins was the then-president. Since 1981, the president has attended all sessions of the G7. The EU is currently represented by the Commission president and the president of the European Council. The latter used to be the rotating chair of the council of EU state leaders, with irregular attendance since 1982. The Council Presidency sometimes coincided with one of the G8 members, in which case that leader attended with their national and European mandate. Since 2009, the president of the European Council is a permanent position, who always attends the summits. As the EU is a member, what the presidents endorse at the G7 is politically binding on them.

The EU attends due to its role in the world economy, and its relevancy increased with the establishment of a single market, common currency and foreign policy. The Paris Summit of 1989 was a landmark year for the EU's participation in the G7, when the G7 asked the EU to assume responsibility for Phare.
