= MIKTA Speakers' Conference =

The MIKTA Speakers' Consultation 2015 took place in Seoul, Republic of Korea on July 1–5 under the theme "Parliamentary Leadership for a Global Future." Initiated by Chung Ui-hwa, Speaker of the National Assembly of the Republic of Korea, the MIKTA Speakers' Consultation 2015 was the inaugural meeting of the parliamentary Speakers of MIKTA, a middle-power consultative mechanism.

== Overview ==
The MIKTA Speakers' Consultation is a consultative body of the parliamentary Speakers of MIKTA (Mexico, Indonesia, Korea, Turkey, and Australia). The Speakers of the MIKTA parliaments gather together for a plenary and bilateral meetings on an annual basis. Discussions are underway for the possible establishment of other cooperative mechanisms. No rules and regulations are in place as yet to govern the date and venue of the Consultation. Decisions on the next meeting are made when the Speakers get together for the annual meeting. In the case of a bicameral legislature, participation is not restricted either to the upper or lower chambers. Members of parliament can join official delegations as well as diplomats based in the host country. The President of the Senate of the United Mexican States, the Chairman of the Regional Representatives Council of the Republic of Indonesia (upper chamber), and the President of the Senate of the Commonwealth of Australia attended the 1st MIKTA Speakers' Consultation, which was held in Seoul, 2015. The Turkish Grand National Assembly was represented by the Turkish Ambassador to Seoul due to the delayed schedule to elect a new Speaker, MPs, diplomats and academics.

== History ==
Chung Ui-hwa, Speaker of the Korean National Assembly, took the initiative to create the parliamentary counterpart of MIKTA, an inter-governmental consultative body. The subsequent approval of the other Speakers led to the official launch of the Consultation. Speaker Chung Ui-hwa put forward the initial proposal to the President of the Turkish Grand National Assembly in October, 2014 during the official visit of the Turkish Speaker to Seoul. The Turkish side agreed to the proposal. Speaker Chung followed up by sending letters to his counterparts in the MIKTA parliaments to gather views on the initiative. As the Speakers expressed their support, the proposal came to fruition. The 1st MIKTA Speakers' Consultation was held in Seoul on July 1–5, 2015 and the main conference took place on July 2.

=== Brief Timeline of the Preparation Process ===
Date	Preparation Process
October, 2014	The President of the Turkish Grand National Assembly agreed in principle to the proposal for the launch of the MIKTA Speakers' Consultation.
October, 2014	Speaker Chung Ui-hwa sent letters to the Speakers of the MIKTA parliaments to gather views on the proposal.
March, 2015	Official invitations were extended to the Speakers of the MIKTA parliaments.
May, 2015	Related documents were sent out to the MIKTA parliaments, including General Information, Concept Note and Registration Form.
July 1, 2015	The MIKTA Speakers' Consultation 2015 opened with its first official event.

== Summary of the Consultation ==
=== Date and Venue ===
The 1st MIKTA Speakers' Consultation was held from 1 to 5 July 2015 in Seoul, Republic of Korea, hosted by the National Assembly of the Republic of Korea.

=== Participation ===
Delegation	Head of Delegation	Speaker	Members of Parliament	Secretaries General	Ambassadors
Mexico	President Barbosa	1	5	-	1
Indonesia	Chairman Gusman	1	6	1	1
South Korea	Speaker Chung Ui-hwa	1	19	1	-
Turkey	-	-	-	-	1
Australia	President Parry	1	-	-	1

※ The Turkish Grand National Assembly was represented by H.E. Arslan Hakan Okçal, Turkish Ambassador to Seoul, as the Turkish Grand National Assembly elected its Speaker on July 1.

=== Sessions and Main Issues ===
The theme of the Consultation was "Parliamentary Leadership for a Global Future."

The first session focused on the role of middle-power parliaments in implementing the Sustainable Development Goals (SDGs). Participants stressed that MIKTA countries should use their collective influence by sharing best practices and expanding legislative cooperation.

The second session addressed regional issues, with each delegation presenting its country's perspective. Mexico raised challenges relating to economic development, organized crime, and migration and human rights. Indonesia offered a SWOT analysis of regional issues facing the MIKTA countries. The Republic of Korea highlighted the 70th anniversary of the end of World War II and the pursuit of lasting peace in Northeast Asia. Turkey called for international efforts to end the Syrian civil war and combat extremism. Australia discussed budget allocation to strengthen parliamentary security and prevent terrorist threats.

The host country convened a special session on the 70th anniversary of the division of the Korean Peninsula and the prospect of peaceful Korean reunification. The keynote address introduced a cooperative model called "P6+A2," combining the parties of the Six Party Talks with the Asian Development Bank and the Asian Infrastructure Investment Bank, as a proposed framework for addressing the North Korean nuclear issue. The delegations reaffirmed MIKTA's collective support for Korea's reunification diplomacy.

In the final session, the Speakers adopted the Joint Statement also known as the Seoul Statement and agreed to hold the Consultation on a regular basis.

=== Joint Press Conference ===
A joint press conference was held on 2 July 2015 at the Westin Chosun in Seoul. It was attended by Speaker Chung Ui-hwa (Republic of Korea), President Luis Miguel Barbosa Huerta (Mexico), Chairman Irman Gusman (Indonesia), President Stephen Parry (Australia), and Ambassador Arslan Hakan Okçal (Turkey).

The Speakers expressed appreciation for the significance of the inaugural Consultation and announced the adoption of the Joint Statement, also known as the Seoul Statement.

=== Special Advisors' Review Session ===
Special advisors are academics and professionals specializing in the agenda of the Consultation. Each delegation is allowed to recommend one special advisor.

The advisors considered the Consultation a success, noting that it had provided an opportunity for the Speakers to identify issues of common interest and had demonstrated its potential as a consultative body among the parliamentary Speakers of the MIKTA countries. The Seoul Statement was seen as establishing guidance for the future direction of the Consultation.

The advisors recommended that future meetings identify specific issues related to both the common challenges of MIKTA countries and their individual national strengths. They also suggested that future agendas be developed in consultation with inter-governmental bodies and expert groups.

=== Bilateral Talks ===
Three bilateral meetings were held on the sidelines of the Consultation at the Westin Chosun in Seoul. Korea met with Indonesia on 1 July at 18:00, followed by Korea–Australia talks at 18:40 on the same evening. The Korea–Mexico bilateral meeting took place on 3 July at 08:30.
