= D-10 Strategy Forum =

Proposed forum of 10 democratic states

Proposed D10 member countries European Union countries not otherwise part of the D10

D-10 refers to an initiative by the US Department of State office of policy planning dating back to 2008. It was picked up by the Atlantic Council, which launched an initiative in 2014 to maintain a "rules-based democratic order" under the leadership of ten "leading democracies".

The "D-10" meeting represents over 60% of the people living in democracies around the world.

The newly minted "Asia Czar" of the United States Department of State, Kurt Campbell, who was portrayed in the press as "a China hawk" and "credited as the architect of the Obama administration's 'pivot to Asia' strategy in 2012", published an article entitled 'How America Can Shore Up Asian Order'. In the article he endorsed the Atlantic Council initiative and subsequent Donald Trump administration proposal to expand the G7 into a larger group of democracies that will be known as the D-10, with the addition of Australia, India and South Korea, as "most urgent for questions of trade, technology, supply chains, and standards."

Members of the D-10 Strategy Forums are as follows:

- Australia
- Canada
- France
- Germany
- India
- Italy
- Japan
- South Korea
- United Kingdom
- United States

== Leaders ==
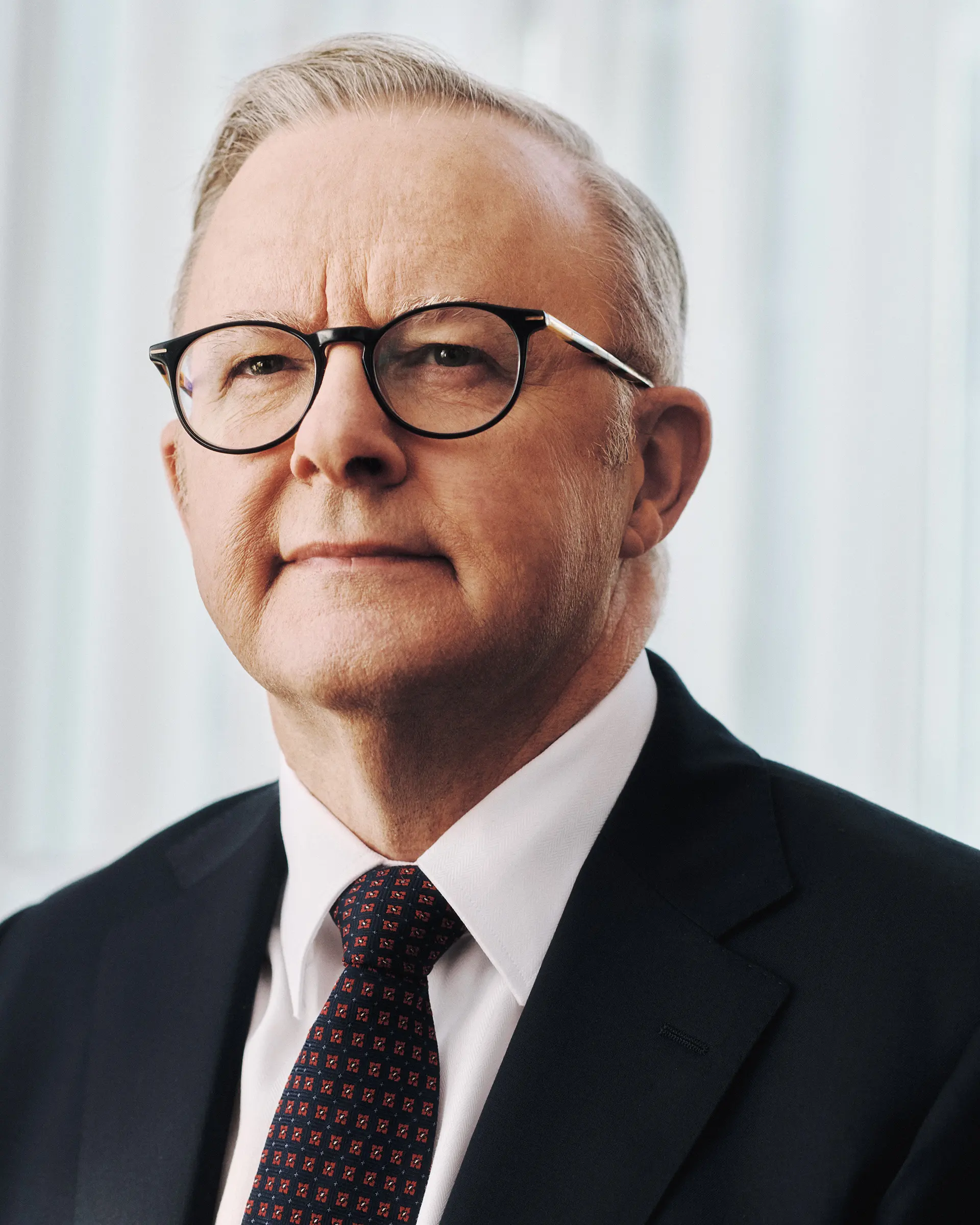
(Australia) Australia
Anthony Albanese,
Prime Minister

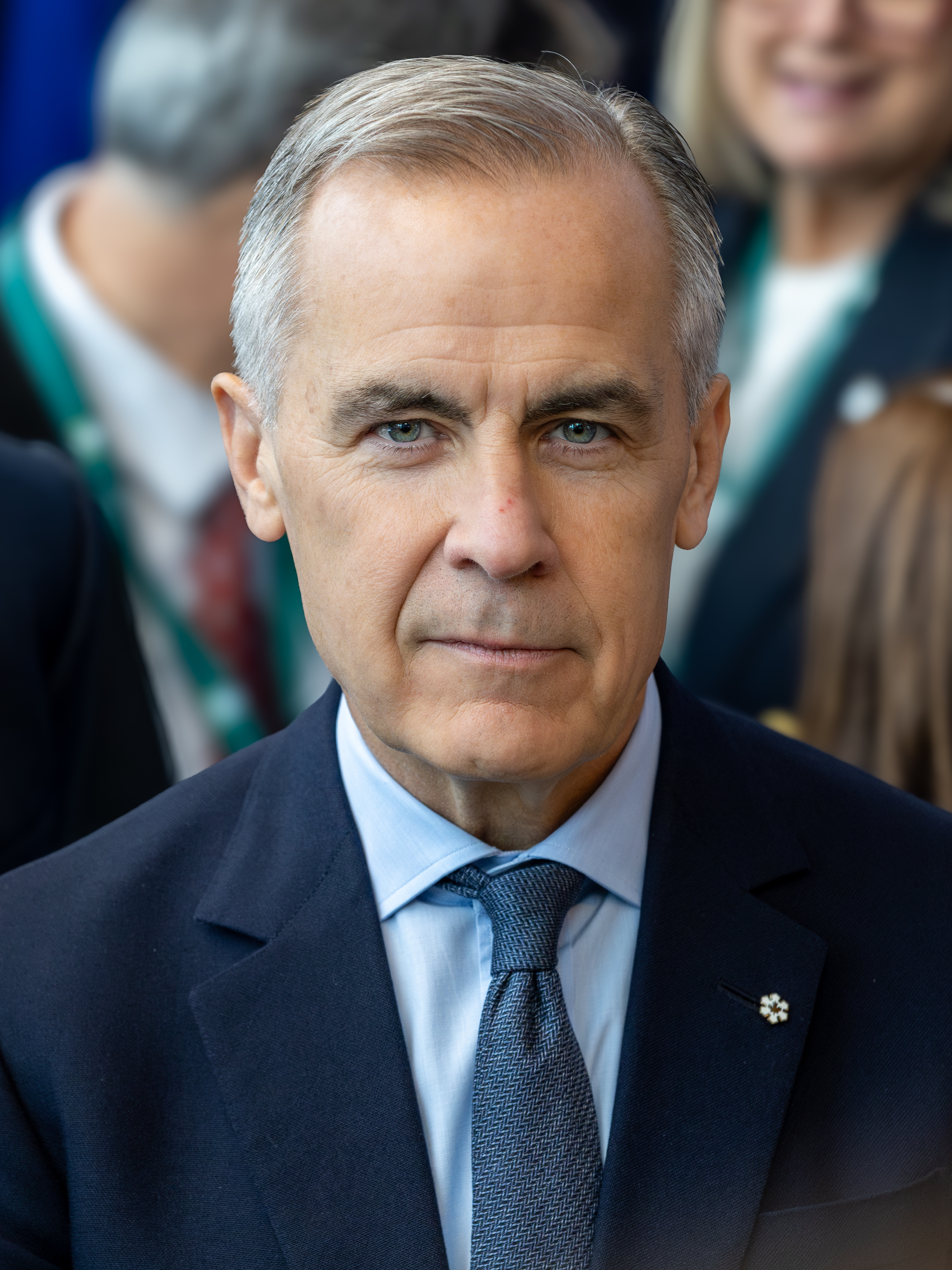
(Canada) Canada
Mark Carney,
Prime Minister

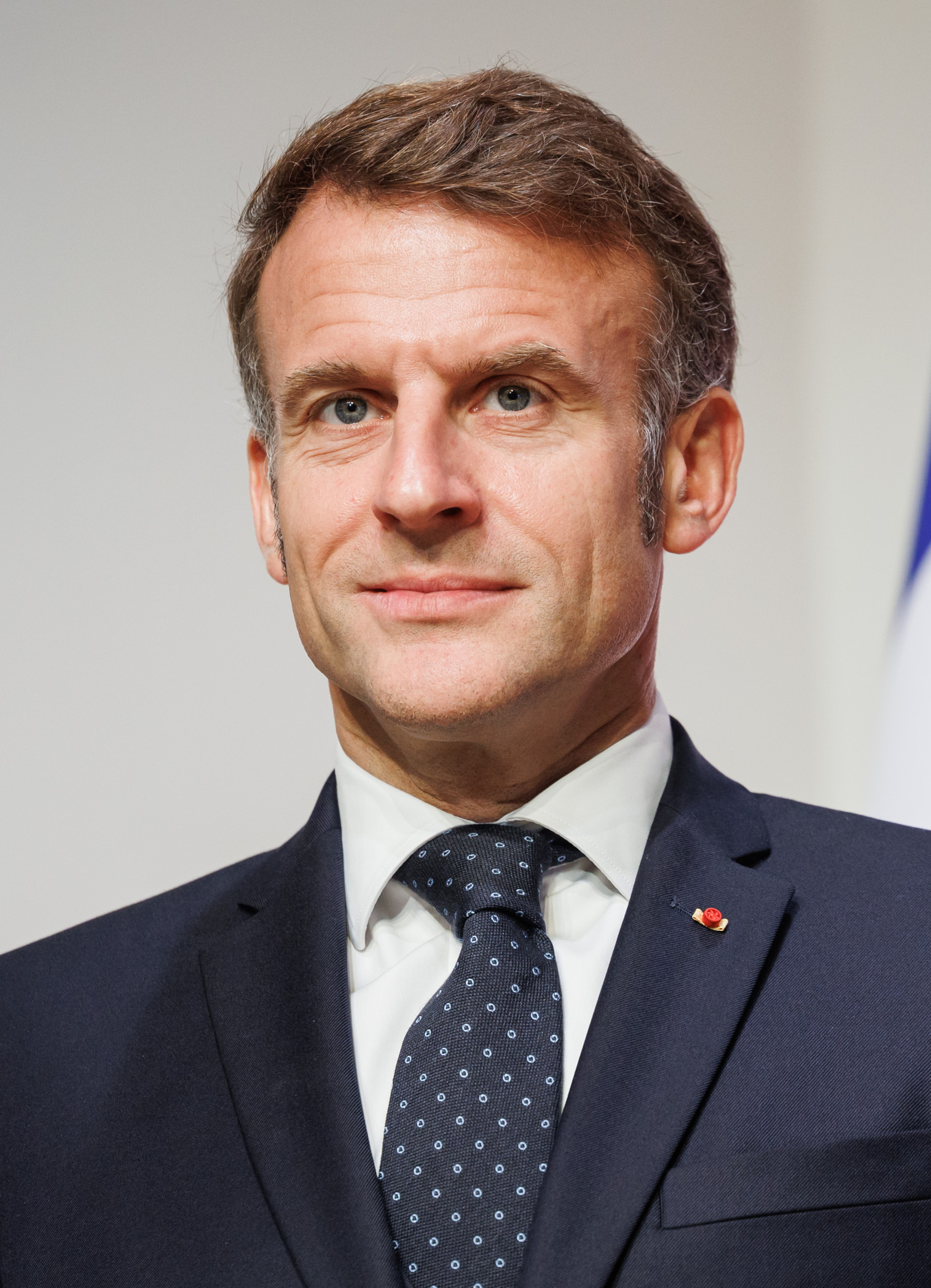
(France) France
Emmanuel Macron,
President

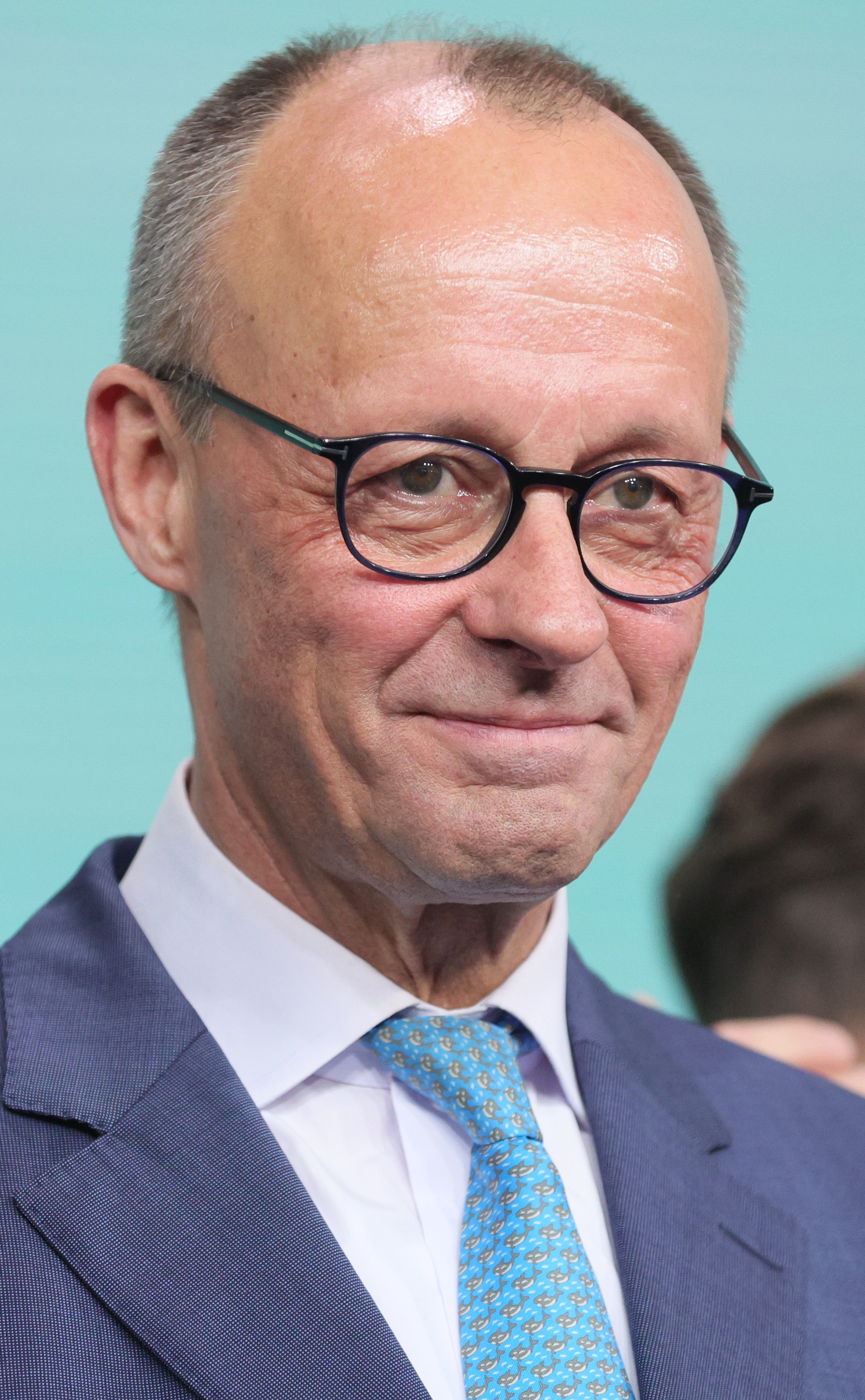
(Germany) Germany
Friedrich Merz,
Chancellor

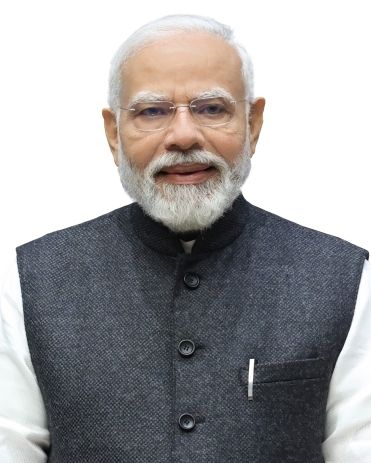
(India) India
Narendra Modi,
Prime Minister

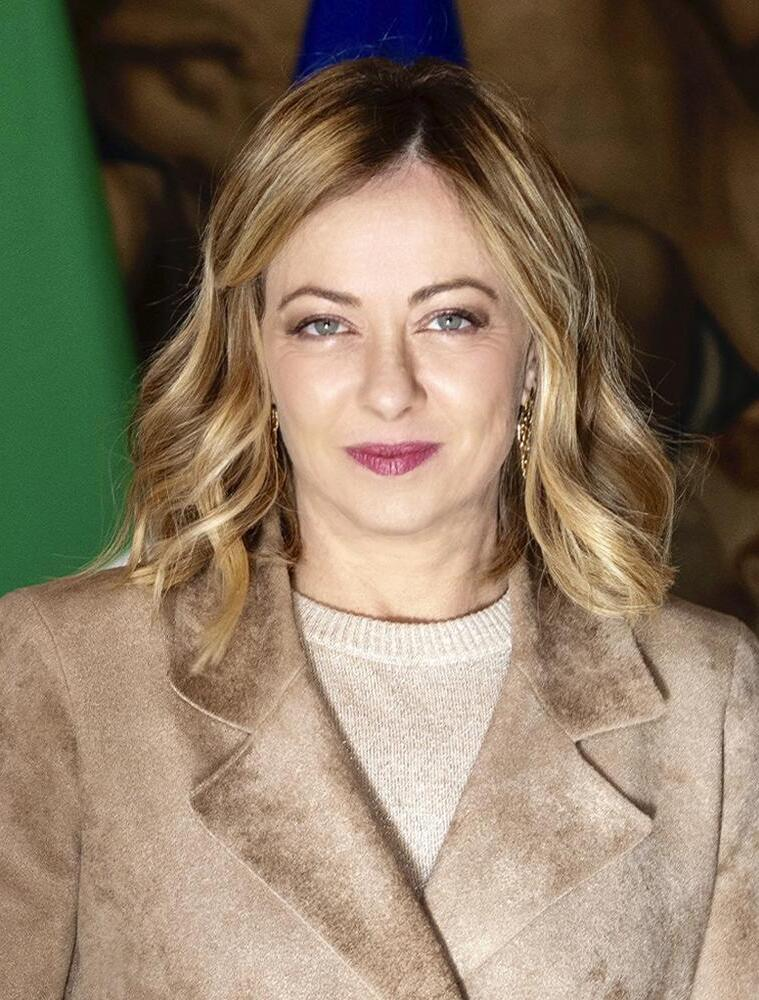
(Italy) Italy
Giorgia Meloni,
Prime Minister

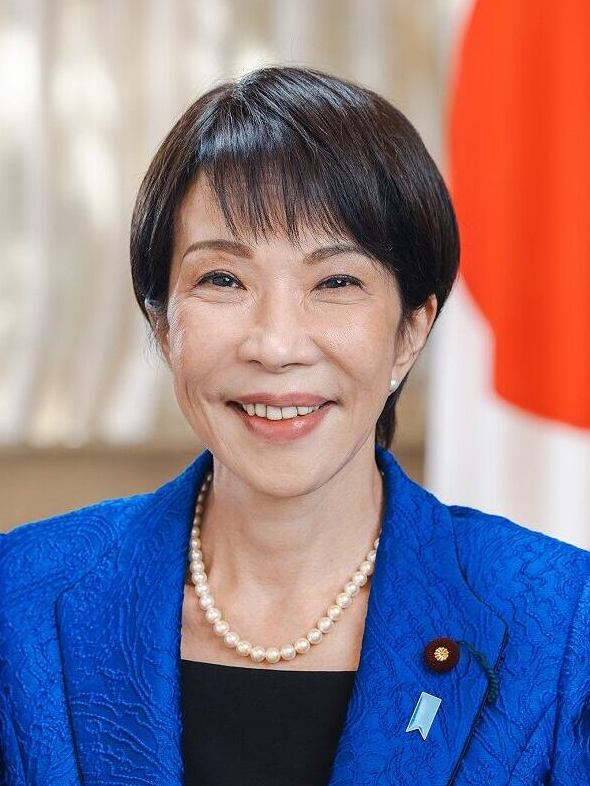
(Japan) Japan
Sanae Takaichi,
Prime Minister

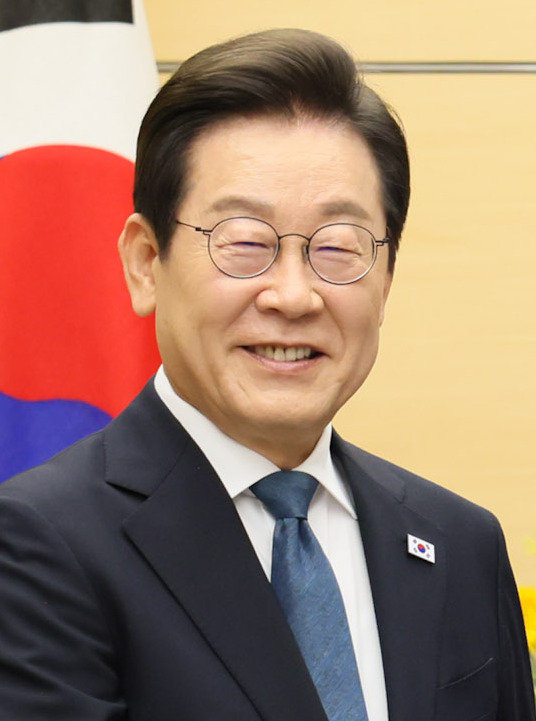
(South Korea) South Korea
Lee Jae Myung,
President

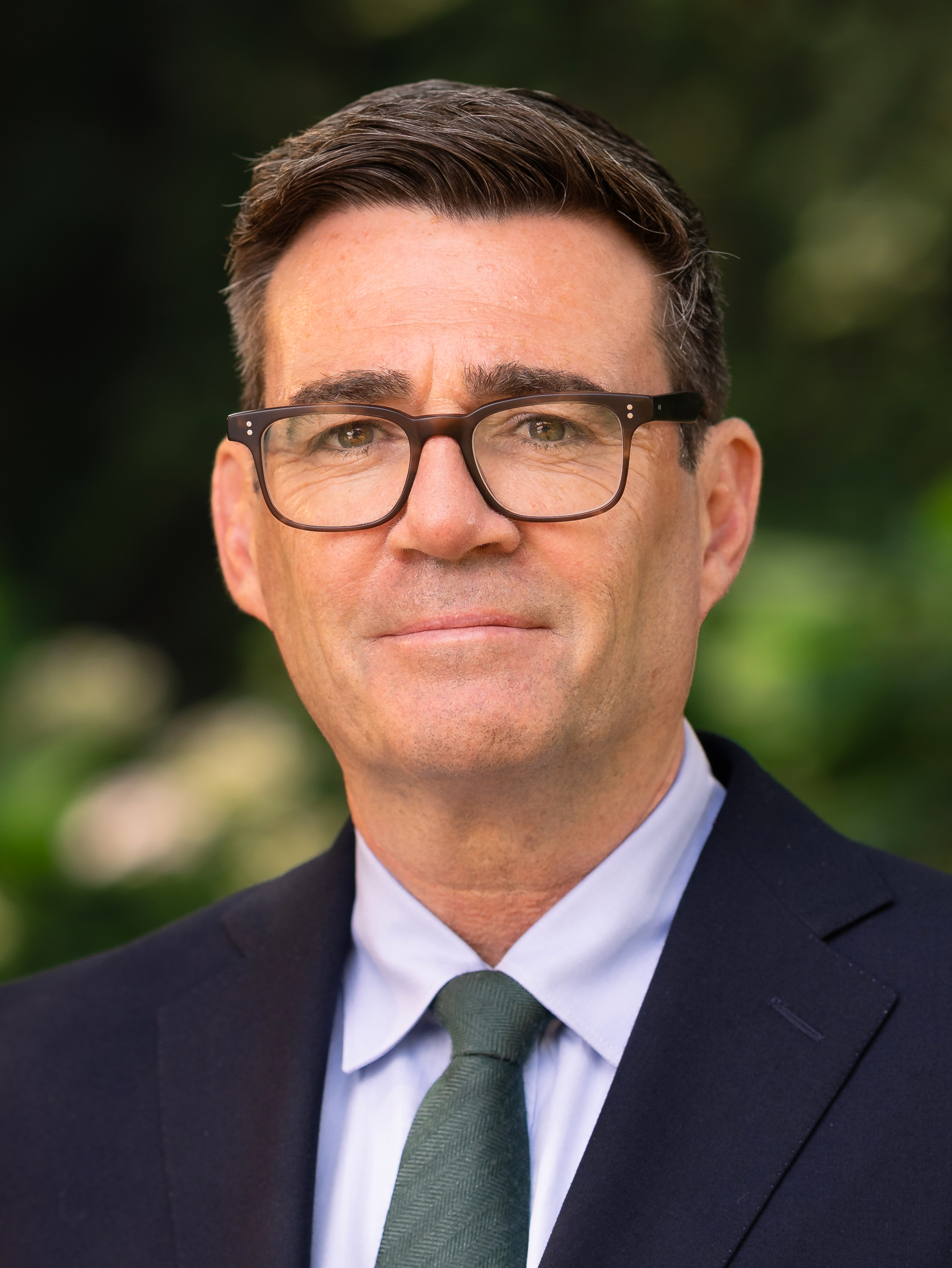
(United Kingdom) United Kingdom
Andy Burnham,
Prime Minister

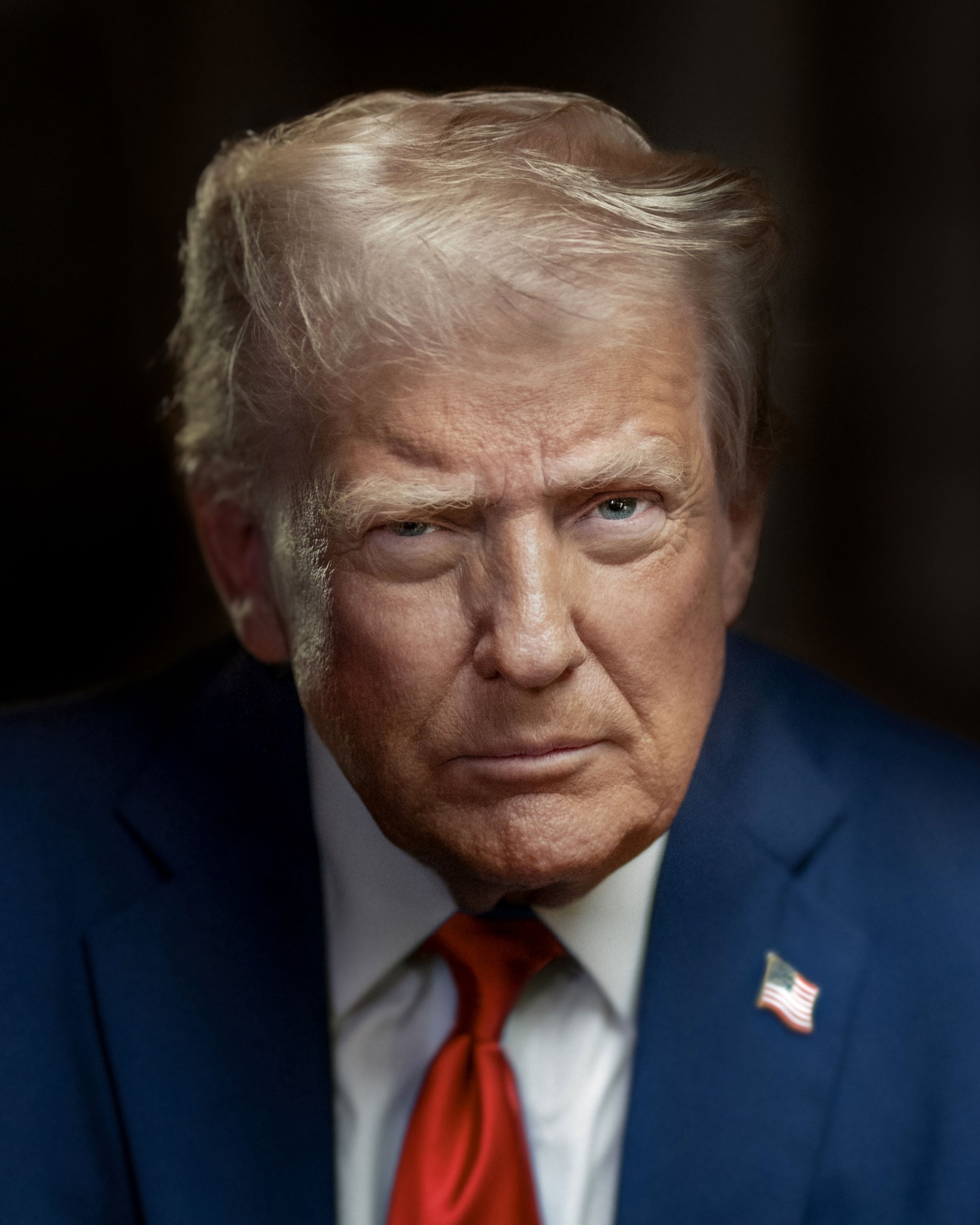
(United States) United States
Donald Trump,
President
