= G10 currencies =

10 of the most heavily traded currencies

The G10 currencies are ten of the most heavily traded currencies in the world, which are also ten of the world's most liquid currencies. Traders regularly buy and sell them in an open market with minimal impact on their own international exchange rates.

The origin of the term G10 currencies is not clear; however, it may be derived from the G10 countries and their agreement to participate in the IMF General Arrangements to Borrow (GAB). There is no longer a one-to-one match between the G10 currencies and the G10 countries.

The G10 currencies are:

- (Australia) Australian dollar (AUD)
- (Canada) Canadian dollar (CAD)
- (European Union) Euro (EUR)
- (Japan) Japanese yen (JPY)
- New Zealand dollar (NZD)
- (Norway) Norwegian krone (NOK)
- (United Kingdom) Pound sterling (GBP)
- (Sweden) Swedish krona (SEK)
- (Switzerland) Swiss franc (CHF)
- United States dollar (USD)

In some banking circles, reference is made to the G11 currencies, which are the G10 currencies plus the Danish krone (DKK).
