= European Group of Five =

Unofficial group within the EU

G6 members.

The European Group of Five (E5) in the European Union is an unofficial group of five European states —France, Germany, Italy, Poland, and Spain with the largest populations and thus with the majority of votes in the Council of the European Union. The group (then with the United Kingdom) was established in 2003 to deal with immigration, terrorism, and enforce law and order. In 2006, Poland joined the group, making it the G6. On 29 March 2017, the United Kingdom triggered Article 50, and left the European Union entirely on 31 January 2020, ending the G6, and beginning the European Group of Five (E5) without the United Kingdom.

G6
Member State	Population	Votes in the Council		Notes
Germany	83,314,906	29	8.4%	
France	65,027,000	29	8.4%	
United Kingdom	63,182,000			Left the EU in 2020
Italy	60,000,068	29	8.4%	
Spain	47,016,894	27	7.8%	
Poland	38,116,000	27	7.8%	Joined in 2006
Total	348,658,527	170	49.3%	

Under the third pillar of the EU, Police and Judicial Co-operation in Criminal Matters, powers are largely intergovernmental; this is the one EU policy area where there is no Commission monopoly on proposing law. In other policy areas, the commission can usually create balance among the states, but in this one, the G6 has a great deal of influence over the commission.

Nicolas Sarkozy has called on the G6 to lead the Union following the dilution of the power of France and Germany after the 2004 enlargement of the European Union. The lack of transparency and accountability of the G6 has been criticised by a number of figures, notably by a report in 2006 by the UK's House of Lords.

== See also ==
- Area of freedom, security and justice
- Big Four (Western Europe)
- Big Five (Eurovision)
- Brexit
- Council of the European Union
- Democratic deficit in the European Union
- European Commission
- Eurovision Song Contest
- EU three
- Group of Seven
- Inner Six
- Intergovernmentalism
- List of European Union member states by population
- Salzburg Forum
- Voting in the Council of the European Union
