= CLS Group =

Financial infrastructure group

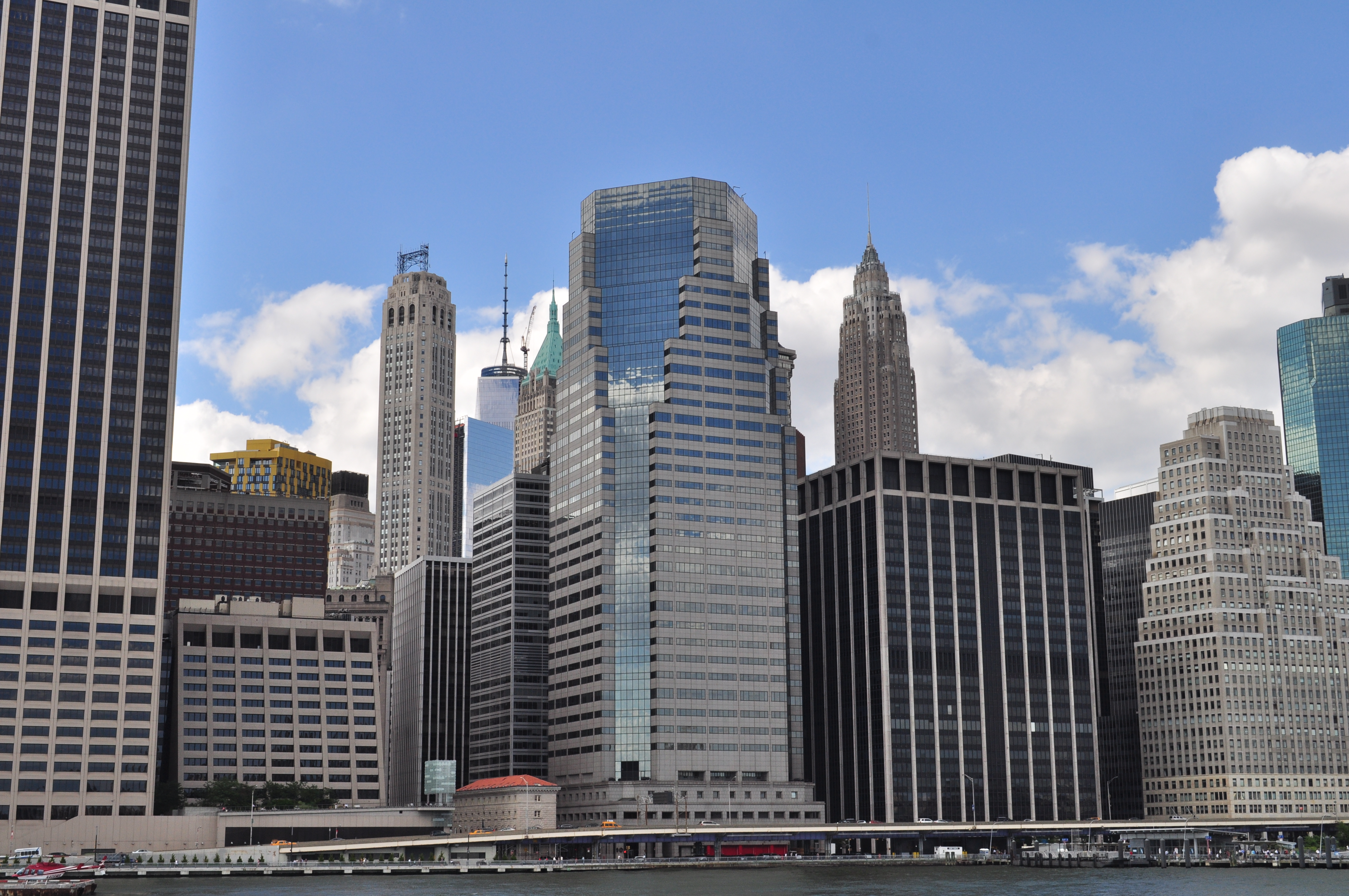
- CLS Bank is headquartered at One Financial Square (center) in Lower Manhattan
- Industry: Financial services
- Founded: July 1997
- Headquarters: Lucerne (holding); New York (bank)
- Area served: 18 currency jurisdictions
- Website: www.cls-group.com

CLS Group (for Continuous Linked Settlement), or simply CLS, is a specialized financial market infrastructure group whose main entity is the New York–based CLS Bank. It started operations in 2002 and operates a unique and global central multicurrency cash settlement system, known as the CLS System, which plays a critical role in the foreign exchange market (also known as forex or FX). Although the forex market is decentralised and has no central exchange or clearing facility, firms that chose to use CLS to settle their FX transactions can mitigate the settlement risk associated with their trades. CLS achieves this thanks to a central net (bilateral and multilateral clearing) and gross payment versus payment settlement service directly connected to the real-time gross settlement systems of participating jurisdictions through accounts at each of their respective central banks.

CLS demonstrated its risk-mitigation value in the 2008 financial crisis, during which the forex market remained orderly even in times of severe systemic financial stress, and again during market turmoil associated with the COVID-19 pandemic in early 2020. The CLS System's sophisticated payment versus payment concept does not entirely eliminate forex settlement risk, but reduces it considerably among the currencies that it encompasses.

== History ==
=== Background ===
The creation of CLS was a delayed collective response to the turmoil that followed the failure of Germany's Herstatt Bank on 26 June 1974, which highlighted the counterparty risk inherent in the system of multilateral net settlement through which forex transactions were executed at the time. Over the three days following Herstatt's demise, the amount of gross funds transferred by that system declined by about 60 percent. The core challenge resulted from the practice of settling each leg of a forex transaction independently, and often at different times with a lag, in the country of issue of each currency. Banks often waited three days or more before they knew with certainty that they had received the currency they had bought in a given such transaction. The risk of paying out the currency sold but not receiving the currency bought became known as "Herstatt risk" as well as foreign exchange settlement risk, comprising aspects of both credit risk and liquidity risk. Similar concerns emerged again following the collapse of Drexel Burnham Lambert in 1989, Bank of Credit and Commerce International in 1991, the 1991 Soviet coup d'état attempt, and the collapse of Barings Bank in 1995.

=== Creation ===
In reaction to these events and following discussion among the G10 central banks, the Bank for International Settlements (BIS) formed successive committees to address the international settlement risk problem, namely the Group of Experts on Payment Systems and the Committee on Interbank Netting Schemes of the Central Banks of the G10 Countries, which in 1990 were replaced by the Committee on Payment and Settlement Systems (CPSS). A series of reports by these groups paved the way towards the creation of CLS, each named after the official who chaired the committee that prepared it:

- the "Angell Report" on Netting Schemes (1989), named after US Federal Reserve policymaker Wayne Angell, described the various kinds of internationally related financial netting arrangements;
- the "Lamfalussy Report" of the Committee on Interbank Netting Schemes (1990), named after BIS policymaker Alexandre Lamfalussy (and not to be confused with the separate Lamfalussy Report of 2001 which initiated the Lamfalussy process in the European Union), identified minimum standards for the design and operation of cross-border and multi-currency netting schemes, as well as core principles for co-operative central bank oversight of netting system that were to shape the oversight concept for CLS;
- the "Noël Report" of the CPSS on Central Bank Payment and Settlement Services with Respect to Cross-Border and Multi-Currency Transactions (1993), named after Bank of Canada policymaker Timothy Noël, analyzed the advantages and disadvantages of different central bank services related to payment and settlement systems, without however recommending a single preferred service option;
- the "Allsopp Report" of the CPSS on Settlement Risk in Foreign Exchange Transactions (1996), named after for Bank of England policymaker Christopher Allsopp, extensively described the past episodes, such as the Herstatt failure, and called on the private sector to find practical solutions to remedy the identified risks, and thus represented "a wake-up call for the [banking] industry" that set the basis for subsequent initiatives including CLS.

Such initiatives also initially included FXNet, which netted trades each day by counterparty pair; the Exchange Clearing HOuse Ltd (ECHO), a London-based multilateral netting system which started operations in August 1995; and Multinet International Bank, a New York State-chartered bank that similarly developed a multilateral forex netting clearing house. Such entities, however, had no direct access to central bank currency, and struggled to achieve critical mass.

Like FXNet, ECHO and Multinet, CLS was established as a private-sector project, even though the impetus came from the central banking community through the CPSS; the project turned out to be highly complex, nearly foundered on several occasions, and at such points required intervention by the BIS to survive. In October 1994, senior executives from large international banks formed the "group of 20" or G20 (not to be confused with the G20 group of jurisdictions, which was formed in 1999) as a common interest group. Pressure from the central banks, including the publication of the Allsopp report in 1996, led the G20 to meet regularly and focus on a common solution to reduce foreign-exchange-related credit risk. In January 1996, it converged on the solution of a clearing bank operating a payment versus payment mechanism with continuous real-time linked processing and item-by-item settlement, thus the name CLS - meaning that the two legs of a foreign-exchange transaction are settled simultaneously. By the spring of 1997, the G20 banks determined that the future system should rely on a central bank account and membership in the respective real-time gross settlement system in each jurisdiction (known in the payments jargon as a nostro relationship), but no physical presence other than in the United States, United Kingdom, and Japan in order to save costs. This required ad hoc legislation to be passed in participating countries, and also the extension of operating hours in Australia, Canada and Japan.

On 1 July 1997, the G20 banks jointly established CLS Services Ltd in the UK as the project's first dedicated legal entity; other banks were asked for USD 1 million each to join the project as shareholders, as the project building costs were rapidly increasing from an initial estimate of $40m at end-1995. In July 1998, the project had reached an ownership of 60 shareholders in 14 countries, with total commitments of $160m. On 1 November 1999, CLS Bank International was established as a New York Edge Act financial institution after the Federal Reserve approved its application, which had been filed on 6 August 1999.

In 1996 and 1997, various forms of cooperation were considered between the G20's CLS project and the competing initiatives of FXNet, ECHO and Multinet, eventually resulting in the latter initiatives' full acquisition by CLS Services in December 1997. ECHO's service was discontinued in April 1999, and Multinet was dissolved in May 2000. In April 1998, IBM was selected to develop the CLS technical infrastructure. CLS Bank started operating on 9 September 2002, settling the Australian dollar, Canadian dollar, euro, Japanese Yen, Swiss franc, Pound sterling, and US dollar.

Lawrence M. Sweet, an official at the Federal Reserve Bank of New York seconded at the BIS from 1994, was instrumental in the elaboration of the CLS concept as secretary, then chair of the CPSS Steering Group on Foreign Exchange Settlement Risk. He also chaired the CLS Oversight Committee from its formation in 2009 until June 2018.

=== Later development ===
The original seven currencies were joined by the Danish krone, Norwegian krone, Singapore dollar and Swedish krona in September 2003; the Hong Kong dollar, South Korean won, New Zealand dollar and South African rand in December 2004; the Israeli shekel and Mexican peso in May 2008; and the Hungarian forint in November 2015.

Since it began operations in 2002, CLS has rapidly increased and by March 2017 was settling just over 50% of global FX transactions. As a result, the Financial Stability Oversight Council (FSOC) officially designated CLS a systemically important financial market utility in July 2012.

The single day record for value settled is US$15.4 trillion, set on 15 December 2021. The single day record for volume settled is 3.2 million trades, set on 5 July 2022.

The CLS membership and shareholder base has grown accordingly, from 39 members at inception in 2002 to 79 shareholders including 66 settlement members and 24,000+ third-party clients as of September 2017.

== Group organization ==
=== Legal structure ===
Partly as a consequence of the need for consensus among participating central banks, the CLS Group structure involves entities in several countries. Since 2001, the group's parent company has been CLS Group Holdings AG in Lucerne, a Swiss private holding company. It owns 100 percent of CLS UK Intermediate Holdings Ltd in London (the original CLS company established in 1997 as CLS Services Ltd and renamed in 1999), which in turn owns two main subsidiaries: CLS Bank International, a U.S. Edge Act corporation, and CLS Services Ltd, a British company that provides operational support to CLS Bank and associated institutions. The only other jurisdictions where CLS is established are Japan and Hong Kong.

=== Shareholders ===
CLS Group is a commercial entity that is operated on a not-for-profit basis, similarly to the Depository Trust & Clearing Corporation. Its shareholders have governance rights but do not gain dividend income or an increase in the value of their shares from retained earnings. As of 2022, CLS's website disclosed 79 banks from multiple jurisdictions as its shareholders.

=== Supervision and oversight ===
CLS Group Holdings AG, while a Swiss entity, is regulated and supervised by the Federal Reserve as a bank holding company in the United States. The Federal Reserve also regulates CLS Bank International, which it supervises as a bank. Under the unique concept initially defined in the Lamfalussy Report of 1990, the central banks of issue of the currencies (other than the US dollar) that settle in the CLS system are involved in the group's "oversight" but without a regulatory or supervisory mandate; the Federal Reserve Board, supported by the Federal Reserve Bank of New York, is the "primary overseer" of CLS Group and CLS Bank, a role it exercises in consultation with the other participating central banks. The CLS Oversight Committee was formed by the participating central banks in 2009, succeeding earlier committee formats, and operates under a Protocol finalized in December 2015.

As of 2022, the CLS Oversight Committee has 23 members: the respective central banks of issue of the 18 CLS currencies, plus five national banks of the Eurosystem that are also members of the G10, namely those of Belgium, France, Germany, Italy, and the Netherlands.

=== Leadership ===
The management of CLS Bank is based in New York. The CEO of CLS Group and CLS Bank has been, successively, Joseph De Feo (2000-2005), Rob Close (2005-2010), Alan Bozian (June 2010-2012), David Puth (August 2012-December 2019), and Marc Bayle de Jessé (since December 2019).

The boards of both CLS Group and CLS bank have been chaired, successively, by Suzanne Labarge (June 2001-June 2003), Fritz Klein (June 2003-2005), Mark Garvin (2005-June 2007), Gerard Hartsink (2007-October 2014), Ken Harvey (October 2014-June 2022), and Gottfried Leibbrandt (since June 2022).

== Operations ==
CLS operates a payment versus payment (PvP) settlement service which mitigates settlement risk for the foreign-exchange transactions of its settlement members and their customers (third parties). CLS Bank is connected to the real-time gross settlement systems of participating jurisdictions and holds accounts at their respective central banks, typically enabled (outside of the United States) by ad hoc legislation that exempts CLS from local establishment requirements. As such, CLS Bank is connected to Fedwire in the United States, T2 in the euro area, CHAPS in the United Kingdom, SIC in Switzerland, the Reserve Bank Information and Transfer System (RITS) through the SWIFT Payment Delivery Service in Australia, KRONOS in Denmark, CHATS in Hong Kong, BOJ-NET in Japan, BOK-Wire in South Korea, ESAS in New Zealand, Norges Bank Settlement System (NBO) in Norway, MEPS+ in Singapore, SAMOS in South Africa, RIX in Sweden, etc.

CLS operates a global multi-currency cash settlement system through which settlement risk can be mitigated with finality using a combination of PvP (payment versus payment) settlement over CLS central bank accounts, local real-time gross settlements systems (RTGS) and multilateral payment netting supported by a resilient infrastructure.

In a PvP system both sides’ payment instructions for an FX transaction are settled simultaneously. Without PvP there is a serious risk that one party to an FX transaction will deliver the currency it owes, but not receive the other currency from its counterparty, resulting in the loss of principal. This is known as settlement risk, or “Herstatt Risk”, after the German bank, Bankhaus Herstatt, which collapsed in June 1974 leaving many of its FX counterparties with significant losses. In 1995 the Bank for International Settlements presented a possible solution on a PvP basis. In an advancement to this proposal the G20 banks founded an earmarked financial institute, the CLS Bank International.

Following an FX transaction, settlement members submit payment instructions to CLS. These instructions are authenticated and matched by CLS and maintained by the system until settlement date. The CLS daily settlement cycle operates with settlement and funding occurring during a five-hour window when all real-time gross settlement (RTGS) systems in the CLS settlement currency jurisdictions are open and able to make and receive payments. This enables simultaneous settlement of the payments on both sides of an FX transaction.

Each settlement member holds a single multi-currency account with CLS. At the start and end of a normal settlement day, each settlement member has a zero balance on its account. Under normal operations of the settlement service, CLS starts and ends the day with a zero balance in its central bank accounts and in its settlement member accounts. Settlement members may submit instructions relating to their own FX transactions as well as the FX transactions of their third-party customers directly to CLS.

CLS holds accounts with each of the central banks whose currencies it settles.

On each settlement date, upon determining that the accounts of the submitting settlement members satisfy several risk management tests, CLS simultaneously settles each pair of matched payment instructions by making the corresponding debit and credit entries in the settlement members’ accounts at CLS. The settlement of the payment instructions and the associated payments are final and irrevocable.

For example, (GBP/USD = 1.50, EUR/USD = 1.25):

- By trades:
  - Member 1: Buys 1,000 GBP/USD from Member 2
  - Member 2: Buys 1,000 EUR/USD from Member 3
  - Member 3: Buys 1,000 GBP/USD from Member 1
- By currency positions:
  - Member 1: Owes USD1500 and GBP1000, collects USD1500 and GBP1000
  - Member 2: Owes USD1250 and GBP1000, collects EUR1000 and USD1500
  - Member 3: Owes USD1500 and EUR1000, collects USD1250 and GBP1000
- CLS then multi-laterally nets the total obligations:
  - Member 1: Pays 0.0 and receives 0.0
  - Member 2: Pays GBP1000, and receives EUR1000 and USD250
  - Member 3: Pays USD250 and EUR1000, and receives GBP1000

These obligations are funded into and from each member’s respective multi-currency account.

Another key element of the CLS Settlement Service is the liquidity efficiencies delivered through multilateral payment netting. On each day participants will very likely have more than one trade to settle—in practice, major banks will have hundreds or thousands of trades each day. Each day prior to settlement, CLS calculates the funding required of each settlement member on a multilateral netted basis. The amount of cash required by CLS to settle all payment instructions is reduced, allowing each settlement member to transfer only the net amount of its payment obligations in each currency, rather than the total amount of each trade to be settled. On average, CLS netting efficiency is in the region of 96 percent.

In addition to the usual settlement service, the in/out swap process is done before the settlement windows to reduce the payment obligations to CLS and to mitigate liquidity pressures. An in/out swap is an intraday swap consisting of two equal and opposite FX transactions that are agreed as an intraday swap.

One of the “legs” is settled inside CLS in order to reduce each settlement member’s net position in the two relevant currencies. The other “leg” is settled outside CLS.

The in/out swap further compresses payment obligation by an average of 75%, which results in a funding requirement in CLS of less than 1% of the total gross settlement value.

== CLS currencies ==
CLS has expanded the number of currencies it settles over the years and currently (mid-2022) settles:

| Country/entity | Symbol | Currency |
|---|---|---|
| Australia | AUD | Australian dollar |
| Canada | CAD | Canadian dollar |
| Denmark | DKK | Danish krone |
| (Europe) Eurozone | EUR | Euro |
| Hong Kong | HKD | Hong Kong dollar |
| Hungary | HUF | Hungarian forint |
| Israel | ILS | Israeli new shekel |
| Japan | JPY | Japanese yen |
| Mexico | MXN | Mexican peso |
| New Zealand | NZD | New Zealand dollar |
| Norway | NOK | Norwegian krone |
| Singapore | SGD | Singapore dollar |
| South Africa | ZAR | South African rand |
| South Korea | KRW | South Korean won |
| Sweden | SEK | Swedish krona |
| Switzerland | CHF | Swiss franc |
| United Kingdom | GBP | Pound sterling |
| United States | USD | United States dollar |

== Shareholders ==
As of mid-2024, the CLS Group had 75 shareholders (NB European flag refers to banks under European banking supervision):

- (South Africa) Absa Bank
- (Australia) ANZ Bank
- (European Union) Banco Bilbao Vizcaya Argentaria
- (Mexico) Banco Monex
- (Spain) Banco Santander
- (Israel) Bank Hapoalim
- (Israel) Bank Leumi
- (United States) Bank of America
- Bank of China (Hong Kong)
- (Canada) Bank of Montreal
- (United States) BNY Mellon
- (Canada) Bank of Nova Scotia
- (United Kingdom) Barclays
- (European Union) Bayerische Landesbank
- (European Union) BNP Paribas
- (Canada) Canadian Imperial Bank of Commerce
- (United States) Citibank
- (United States) Citadel Securities
- (European Union) Commerzbank
- (Australia) Commonwealth Bank
- (European Union) Coöperatieve Rabobank
- (European Union) Crédit Agricole Corporate and Investment Bank
- (Japan) Daiwa Securities
- (Denmark) Danske Bank
- (Singapore) DBS Bank
- (European Union) Deutsche Bank
- (Norway) DNB Bank
- (European Union) DZ Bank
- (South Africa) FirstRand Bank
- (United States) Goldman Sachs
- (United Kingdom) HSBC
- (European Union) ING Group
- (European Union) Intesa Sanpaolo
- (United States) JPMorgan Chase
- (European Union) KBC Bank
- (Korea) KEB Hana Bank
- (Korea) Kookmin Bank
- (United Kingdom) Lloyds Bank
- (Australia) Macquarie Group
- (Japan) Mitsubishi UFJ Trust and Banking Corporation
- (Japan) Mizuho Bank
- (United Kingdom) Morgan Stanley
- (Japan) MUFG Bank
- National Australia Bank
- (European Union) National Bank of Greece
- (European Union) Natixis
- (Scotland) NatWest Markets
- (United Kingdom) NatWest
- (South Africa) Nedbank
- (United Kingdom) Nomura International
- (European Union) Nordea Bank
- (Japan) Norinchukin Bank
- (United States) Northern Trust
- (Singapore) Oversea-Chinese Banking Corporation
- Reserve Bank of New Zealand
- Royal Bank of Canada
- (United Kingdom) Santander UK
- (Korea) Shinhan Bank
- (Sweden) Skandinaviska Enskilda Banken
- (European Union) Société Générale
- Standard Bank of South Africa
- (United Kingdom) Standard Chartered Bank
- (United States) State Street Bank & Trust Company
- (Japan) Sumitomo Mitsui Banking Corporation
- (Japan) Sumitomo Mitsui Trust Bank
- (Sweden) Svenska Handelsbanken
- (Sweden) Swedbank
- (Canada) Toronto-Dominion Bank
- (Switzerland) UBS
- (European Union) UniCredit Bank
- (European Union) UniCredit SpA
- (Singapore) United Overseas Bank
- (United States) Wells Fargo
- (Australia) Westpac
- (Switzerland) Zürcher Kantonalbank

== See also ==
- SWIFT
