= Norddeutsche Landesbank =

German bank

Coordinates: 52°22′3″N 9°44′29″E

Norddeutsche Landesbank Girozentrale
- Type: Public-law institution
- Industry: Banking
- Founded: July 1, 1970
- Headquarters: Hanover, Germany
- Key people: Jörg Frischholz (CEO); Reinhold Hilbers (Chairman of the Supervisory Board)
- Products: Financial services
- Net income: 85,116,142.95 euro (2017)
- Total assets: ▼€ 160 billion (2018)
- Number of employees: 6,453 (2017)
- Website: www.nordlb.com

The Norddeutsche Landesbank Girozentrale (abbreviated NORD/LB) is a German Landesbank and one of the largest commercial banks in Germany. It is a public corporation majority-owned by the federal states of Lower Saxony and Saxony-Anhalt with its head office in Hanover and branches in Braunschweig and Magdeburg. Regional Sparkassen hold a minority stake of 35 percent.

NORD/LB has been designated as a Significant Institution since the entry into force of European Banking Supervision in late 2014, and as a consequence is directly supervised by the European Central Bank.

== History ==
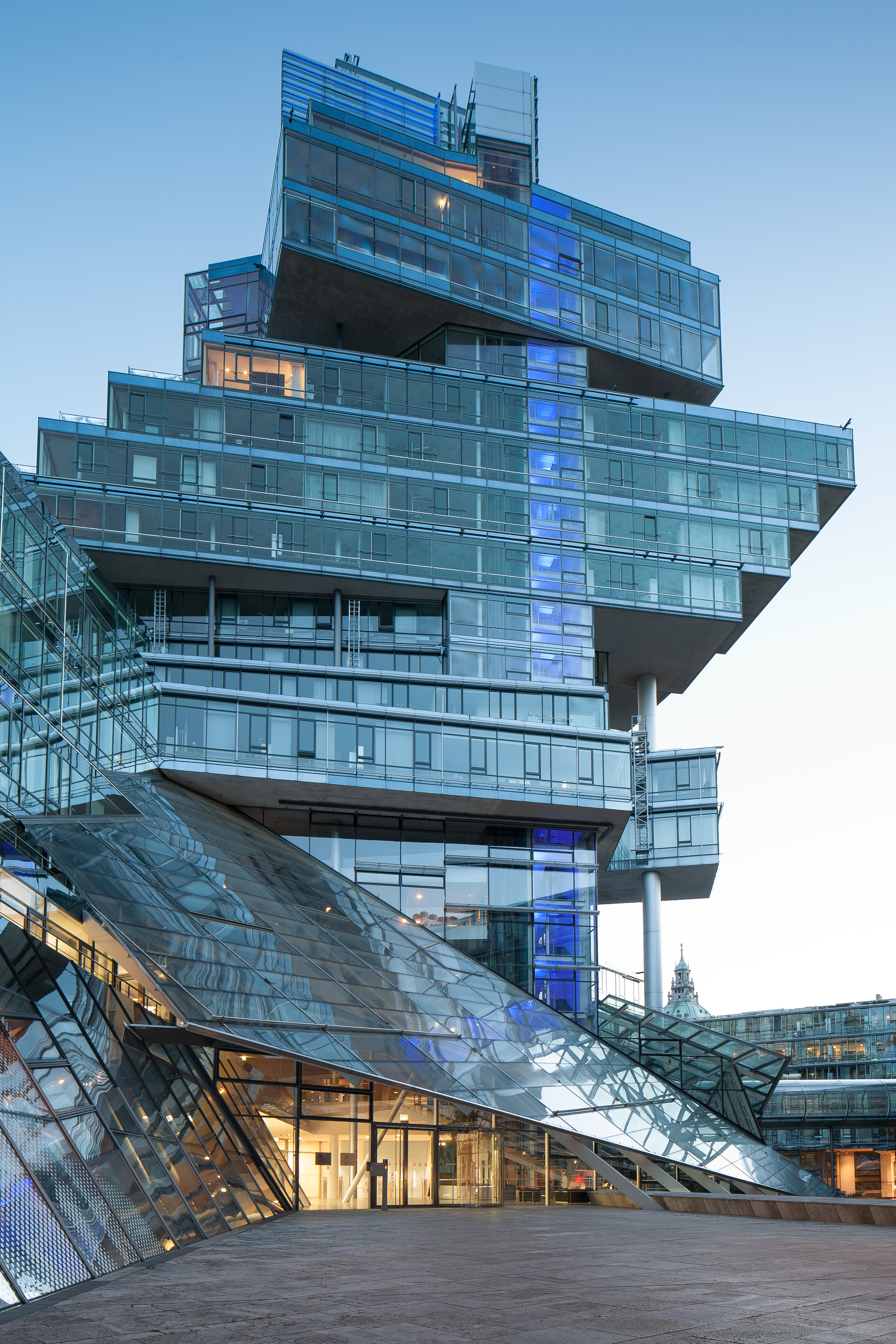
NORD/LB head office in Hanover designed by Behnisch Architekten

=== Beginnings ===
NORD/LB was established in 1765 as Braunschweigische Staatsbank. Under the current name, the bank started its business on 1 July 1970. The main areas of specialization of NORD/LB are investment banking, agricultural and real estate banking, corporate finance, ship and aircraft financing and private banking. NORD/LB maintains branch offices in all major financial and trading centers, including London (since 1985), Singapore (since 2004) and New York City (since 1991). Today, NORD/LB is Germany's largest bank for national and international bond issues.

In 1992, a new state treaty between the federal states of Lower Saxony, Saxony-Anhalt and Mecklenburg Western-Pomerania was signed so that NORD/LB; NORD/LB became the first landesbank owned by three German federal states. Mecklenburg-Western Pomerania sold its stake in NORD/LB in 2005.

=== 2008 financial crisis ===
Before the 2008 financial crisis, NORD/LB, like many German banks, pushed into lending to companies transporting the world's burgeoning trade in goods and raw materials, propelling Germany to the top spot in ship lending worldwide. Following the crisis, it joined peers such as HSH Nordbank, Commerzbank, Deutsche Hypothekenbank and KfW in taking large writedowns and boosting capital buffers against the risk of shipping loans turning sour.

In 2010, NORD/LB sold its minority share in DnB NORD to Norwegian DNB ASA. Similar to other public lenders, it opted for additional support from its regional state owners instead of drawing on help from SoFFin, the federal government's bail-out scheme.

=== Restructuring ===
By 2016, however, NORD/LB still saw a record loss of 1.96 billion euros ($2.1 billion), caused by 2.94 billion euros in provisions for bad shipping loans. As a result, it took full control of its loss-making Bremer Landesbank (BLB) unit, which suffered particularly from a weak shipping market that was chipping away at its capital.

Between 2016 and 2017, NORD/LB engaged in – ultimately unsuccessful – negotiations on selling a $1.5 billion portfolio of shipping loans to KKR Credit and a sovereign wealth fund. By late 2016, it still had about 8 billion euros in non-performing shipping loans in its books.

In 2016, NORD/LB also tasked N M Rothschild & Sons with advising it on options for its restructuring, including the sale of Deutsche Hypothekenbank. By the end of 2017, Aareal Bank and Deutsche Pfandbriefbank (PBB) were expected to hand in final offers for Deutsche Hypo, with the bids valuing the bank at more than 0.7 times its book value of about 700 million euros. That year, the bank turned a small profit. In January 2018, NORD/LB decided not to sell after all. Instead, it sold the majority of its asset management arm to M. M. Warburg & Co. Also, several banks and investment firms – Advent International, Apollo Global Management, Centerbridge Partners, Cerberus Capital Management, Christofferson, Robb & Company, Commerzbank and Helaba – submitted bids for a stake in the bank and a 3.5 billion euro ($3.98 billion) capital injection. Eventually, Cerberus and Centerbrigde submitted a joint offer, suggesting to each acquire a 24.9 per cent stake. Helaba ended up not handing in a final offer and was therefore no longer part of the formal auction process, but talks between NORD/LB and Helaba stakeholders continued throughout the bidding process on whether a public-sector solution could be found.

Meanwhile, in October 2018, NORD/LB scored worst among German lenders in the European Banking Authority's EU-wide stress tests. It also incurred a record loss of more than 2 billion euros.

Under a last-minute 3.6 billion euros rescue plan for NORD/LB presented in early 2019, the Deutscher Sparkassen- und Giroverband (DSGV) provided about 1.2 billion euros in fresh equity. Lower Saxony's state government – then led by Minister-President Stephan Weil − provided another 1.5 billion euros in cash plus an unspecified amount of non-cash balance sheet support needed to close a 3.5 billion euros equity shortfall at the bank. The state of Saxony-Anhalt agreed to contribute 198 million euros. In addition, Lower Saxony guaranteed some loans which brought NORD/LB further capital relief of 800 million euros.

In recent years, NORD/LB has developed a range of partners to bundle loan portfolios and place them with investors, working with insurers Talanx and ERGO Group, Bankhaus Lampe and Bavarian pension fund Bayerische Versorgungskammer (BVK). Its lending business runs on a joint IT platform with BayernLB.

== Assets ==
NORD/LB holds shares in various subsidiaries, including the following:

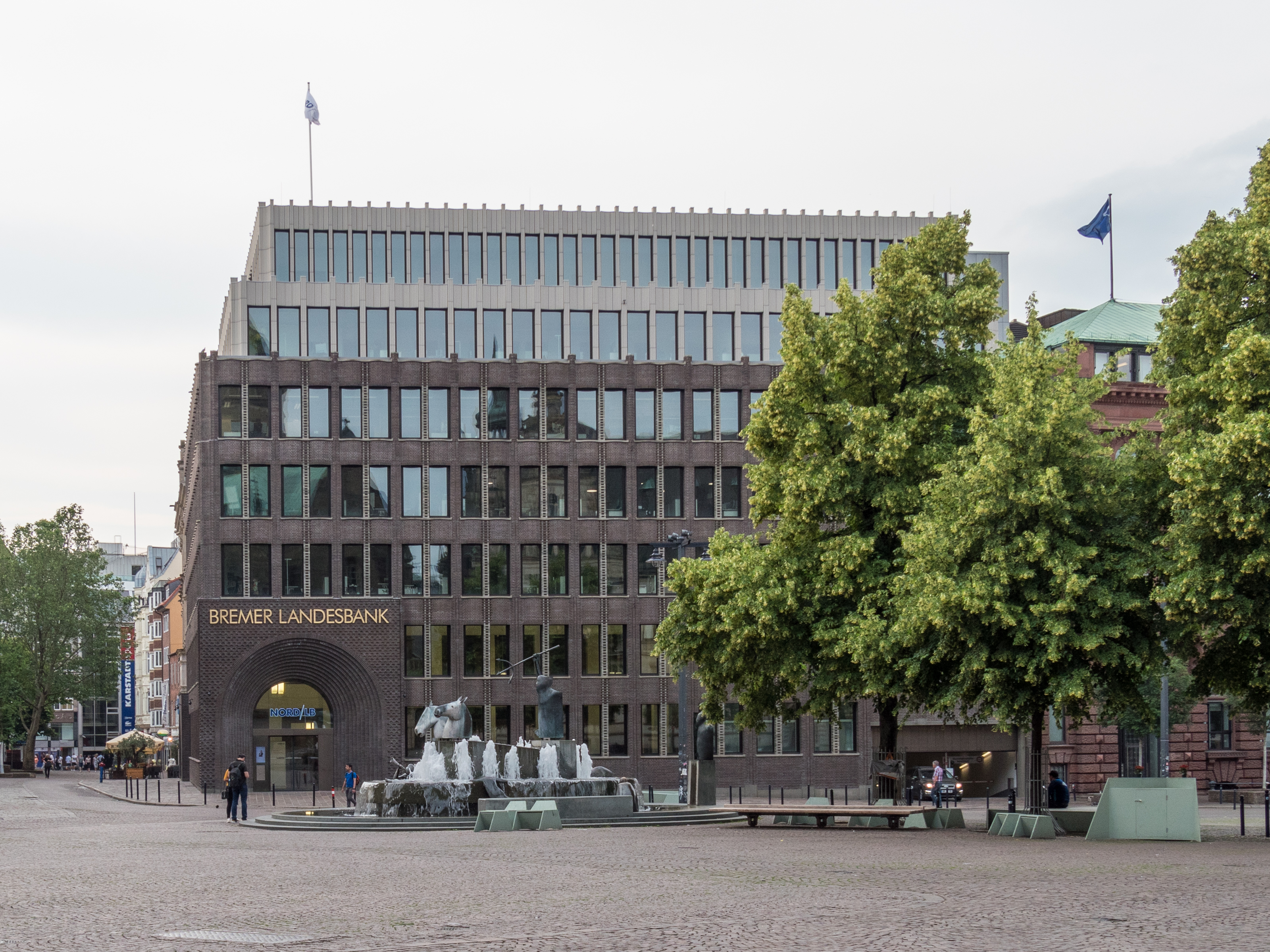
Headquarters of the former Bremer Landesbank in Bremen

- Braunschweigische Landessparkasse
- Bremer Landesbank (100%)
- Caplantic GmbH (45%)
- Deutsche Hypothekenbank (100%)
- KreditServices Nord (100%)
- NORD/LB Asset Management (100%)
- Norddeutsche Facility Management GmbH (100%)
- LBS Norddeutsche Landesbausparkasse Berlin-Hannover (44%)
- NORD/LB Luxembourg S.A. Covered Bond Bank (100%)
- NORD/LB Vermögensmanagement Luxembourg S.A (100%)
- Öffentliche Versicherung Braunschweig (75%)
- Öffentliche Versicherung Bremen (20%)
- Nord Holding (15%)
- Toto-Lotto Niedersachsen (49.85%)
- Bremer Toto und Lotto (33.33%)
- International Neuroscience Institute (22.67%)
- Porzellanmanufaktur Fürstenberg (98%)
- LHI Leasing GmbH (49%)

Between 1973 and 2010, NORD/LB held a 25 percent share in Berenberg Bank.

== Art collection ==
In 1985 NORD/LB started to build up an art collection with the aim of representing post-1945 modern art in an international context. The collection today comprises about 3,000 artworks, still with an emphasis on postwar art, including Georg Baselitz, Joseph Beuys, Gerhard Richter, Sol LeWitt, Jeff Koons, Jannis Kounellis and Jörg Immendorff, among others. Employees can use the works to decorate the buildings, and they are displayed within the bank's own exhibition program. In 1999 it was able to open the exhibition space of its own.

In 2009, NORD/LB returned Franz Marc's Cat Behind a Tree (1910), a painting the bank had bought in 1983, to the descendant of a Jewish shoe-manufacturing family persecuted by the Nazis; the bank had loaned the painting long-term to the Sprengel Museum in Hanover. In 2012, the bank sold its Jeff Koons sculpture, Tulips (1995-2004), from the “Celebration” series for 33.7 million dollars. The bank announced to use the proceeds to set up a foundation to promote contemporary art and cultural projects in northern Germany.

== In China ==
- On March 10, 2004, NORD/LB received a letter from the China Banking Regulatory Commission, approving the opening of a branch in Shanghai.

== See also ==
- 2010 Nord LB Open
- List of banks in the euro area
- List of banks in Germany
