= SWIFT message types =

International banking protocol messages

SWIFT message types are the format or schema used to send messages to financial institutions on the SWIFT network. The original message types were developed by SWIFT and a subset was retrospectively made into an ISO standard, ISO 15022. In many instances, SWIFT message types between custodians follow the ISO standard. This was later supplemented by a XML based version under ISO 20022.

== Composition of MT number ==
SWIFT messages consist of five blocks of data including three headers, message content, and a trailer. Message types are crucial to identifying content.

All SWIFT messages include the literal "MT" (message type/text). This is followed by a three-digit number that denotes the message category, group and type. Consider the following two examples.

Example 1

MT304

- The first digit (3) represents the category. A category denotes messages that relate to particular financial instruments or services such as precious metals (6), treasury (3), or traveller's cheques (8). The category denoted by 3 is treasury markets
- The second digit (0) represents a group of related parts in a transaction life cycle. The group indicated by 0 is a financial institution transfer.
- The third digit (4) is the type that denotes the specific message. There are several hundred message types across the categories. The type represented by 4 is a notification.

A MT304 message is considered an "Advice/Instruction of a Third Party Deal" and it used to advise of or instruct the settlement of a third party foreign exchange deal. For example, an asset manager who executed a FX transaction with a broker would send a MT304 instruction to the custodian bank of the client.

Example 2

MT103

- The first digit (1) represents the category. The category denoted by 1 is customer payments and cheques.
- The second digit (0) represents a group of related parts in a transaction life cycle. The group indicated by 0 is a financial institution transfer.
- The third digit (3) is the type that denotes the specific message. There are several hundred message types across the categories. The type represented by 3 is a notification.

A MT103 message is considered a "Single Customer Credit Transfer" and is used to instruct a funds transfer.

== Overview of SWIFT MT categories ==
The table below shows the different categories and the message type descriptions.

Category	Message type	Description	Number of message types
0	MT0..	System messages	-
1	MT1..	Customer payments and cheques	19
2	MT2..	Financial institution transfers	18
3	MT3..	Treasury markets	27
4	MT4..	Collection and cash letters	17
5	MT5..	Securities Markets	60
6	MT6..	Treasury markets – metals and syndications	22
7	MT7..	Documentary credits and guarantees	29
8	MT8..	Traveller's cheques	11
9	MT9..	Cash management and customer status	21

== ISO 15022 MT ==
Although ISO 15022 message types are different in their structure from the SWIFT MT, the naming convention remains the same.

== Legal status ==
The Courts in England and Wales have held that the header of a SWIFT message amounts to a valid form of electronic signature.

== See also ==
- Delivery versus payment
- ISO 9362 (standard format for SWIFT IDs)
- MT202 COV
- MT940
