= Dirk Jens Nonnenmacher =

- Born: 3 June 1963 (age 63); Karlsruhe, Baden-Württemberg, West Germany
- Education: University of Ulm
- Occupation: Manager

Dirk Jens Nonnenmacher (born 3 June 1963) is a former CEO and chairman of HSH Nordbank. A trained mathematician, Nonnenmacher worked for several private banks before joining HSH Nordbank in 2007. He became chairman in November 2008, succeeding Hans Berger and left the bank in March 2011.

== Biography ==
Nonnenmacher studied mathematics and medicine, before receiving his Ph.D. under supervision of Wolfgang B. Jurkat in 1990. He earned his habilitation in 1993.
