= EBAM =

Electronic Bank Account Management (abbreviated as eBAM) represents the automation, through software, of the following activities between banks and their corporate customers:

- Opening bank accounts
- Maintaining bank accounts such as changing account signatories or spending limits
- Closing bank accounts
- Generating reports as required by law or regulation

The technology that is commonly used to implement eBAM automation is defined by SWIFT and the ISO 20022 Standard for Financial Services Messaging.

Most medium to large companies use an average of six cash management banks, within this average about 30% use 6 or fewer, 40% use 7-20, and 30% use 21 or more. The number of bank accounts managed varies from a less than 50 to 100s or even 1,000s.This involves collecting and managing a vast amount of data describing the details of each bank account and controlling the delegation of authority to authorize financial transactions.

Any organization with more than 100 bank accounts needs a formal framework, policy and management processes for: 1) bank account reduction, and 2) overall management of banks and accounts.

== Bank account reduction ==
Each bank relationship and each bank account costs time and money to manage and administer. The number of banks and accounts should, wherever practical and the counter party risk is acceptable, be minimised. Many corporate treasury departments have had a bank reduction programme for many years, but since the bank crisis in 2008, some departments have been increasing the number of banks to spread their counter-party financial and operational risk. The need to reduce the number of bank accounts remains. One or two bank accounts per business units is a useful objective.

== Implementation ==
There are three types of corporate eBAM available:

- bank-centric solutions in which the company connects to a single, proprietary bank-owned and bank-hosted system
- corporate-centric solutions in which the company develops or acquires a system for bank account management and connection to their banks
- outsourced hub solutions in which banks and companies use a common hub to provide full inter-operability and a central repository for all bank account information and management.
