= HRX =

HRX may refer to:

- HRX, a brand by Indian actor Hrithik Roshan, including casual wear and film and television production
- Zinc finger protein HRX, or simply HRX, an enzyme
- Hypo Real Estate (stock ticker symbol: HRX), a German company
- hrx, the ISO 639 language code of the Hunsrik language.
