= Axel Wieandt =

German manager

Axel Wieandt (born 19 September 1966) is a German manager. He has been serving as an honorary professor at WHU – Otto Beisheim School of Management (WHU) since 2005.

== Early life and education ==
Axel Wieandt is the son of Paul Wieandt, former CEO of several German banks. Axel Wieandt is married and father of two children.

In 1986, he started his academic studies at WHU – Otto Beisheim School of Management, where he graduated with a degree in Business administration ("Diplom Kaufmann"). Between 1988 and 1990, he was a scholar of Studienstiftung des Deutschen Volkes. In 1992, he earned an MBA at Kellogg School of Management, Northwestern University (Illinois), supported by a DAAD scholarship. In 1993, he completed his doctorate in Business Administration (Dr. rer. pol.) at WHU, with Horst Albach as his thesis advisor.

== Career ==
Wieandt started his career in 1993 at McKinsey & Company in Düsseldorf and Boston. Between 1997 and 1998, he worked for Morgan Stanley in London in the Mergers & Acquisitions and Restructuring Department.

=== Deutsche Bank ===
In 1998, he left Morgan Stanley to join Deutsche Bank and became the youngest divisional head in Deutsche Bank's Corporate Center in 2000. As Head of Corporate Development, Wieandt and his team were in charge of developing Deutsche Bank's Group strategy as well as executing strategic transactions. From 2003 onward, he was also appointed Global Head of Corporate Investments, with P&L responsibility for the bank's entire investment with a total volume of several billion EUR.

=== Hypo Real Estate ===
In October 2008, former German Federal Minister of Finance Peer Steinbrück announced that the Hypo Real Estate's entire board of directors would be replaced. At the time, the bank was experiencing severe financial difficulties as a result of the financial crisis. A consortium of German financial service providers proposed that Axel Wieandt serve as HRE's Chief Executive Officer. Thereafter, Wieandt was appointed CEO and Chairman of the Management Board of HRE. On March 25, 2010, he offered his resignation as CEO to the supervisory board of HRE. The supervisory board accepted and released him from his duties. According to an HRE press release, the reasons cited for this were differences in opinion regarding the management of the bank between the CEO and the Financial Market Stabilisation Fund (SoFFin, the governmental entity that owns HRE). German news magazine Der Spiegel confirmed these discrepancies. According to Der Spiegel journalists Christoph Pauly and Beat Balzli, Wieandt deemed these differences in opinion an "imposition". According to insiders, Wieandt demanded more entrepreneurial freedom from the government, the sole owner of HRE. Whereas, according to Wieandt, the bank's core capital ratio should be kept above ten percent, SoFFin's chief executive Hannes Rehm had promised a "gentle handling" of taxpayers’ money and urged for a lower figure. According to German business magazine Manager Magazin, the HRE's supervisory board deemed that, "Wieandt contributed significantly to the bank's stabilisation and realignment". Journalists Eigendorf and Jost wrote in German daily newspaper Die Welt that "Wieandt did a good job at HRE". They argued that Wieandt was frustrated about an "unnecessarily time-consuming decision-making process", and a "lack of leeway" in paying HRE staff.

=== Return to Deutsche Bank ===
On June 1, 2010, Wieandt returned to Deutsche Bank as a Managing Director in the Corporate Center responsible for Integration Management. Eigendorf and Jost reported that in 2010, a BaFin associate unexpectedly objected to Axel Wieandt's appointment as CEO of the BHF Bank, leading Deutsche Bank to refrain from an official nomination, which was viewed as a "retort". According to Eigendorf and Jost, there was no doubt in banking circles about Wielandt's professional qualifications. At that time, he was considered one of the potential candidates for a board position within the Deutsche Bank Group. Additionally, BaFin president Jochen Sanio confirmed in a press interview that he had had a personal conversation with Wieandt in Bonn and stated that there were "no banking supervisory legal reasons for not appointing Wieandt Chief Executive Officer".

=== Credit Suisse ===
On 1 July 2011, Wieandt was appointed Managing Director of Credit Suisse Deutschland's Investment Banking Department, where he served as an account executive overseeing financial service provider clients from countries such as Germany, Austria, Sweden, and Norway. In June 2012, Wieandt resigned from his position at Credit Suisse.

=== Valovis Bank ===
On 26 October 2012, Axel Wieandt was appointed CEO and Chairman of the Management Board of the Valovis Bank. The former Karstadt-Quelle-Bank specializes in credit cards, real estate financing and factoring in the German market. On the back of write-downs on Greek government bonds in December 2011, the bank had to be rescued by the Association of German Banks (Bundesverband deutscher Banken, BdB). According to the German daily newspaper FAZ Wieandt took over a "difficult case". In the Valovis press release he said that "we will critically examine the business model and take the necessary measures to stabilize the bank". As of June 30, 2015, he left the board of Valovis Bank.

=== Former consulting activities and board memberships ===
From December 2003 until June 2010, Wieandt served as a Supervisory Board Member of Dutch credit insurer Atradius. From February 2011 until April 2017, Wieandt was a counsellor at Aquila Capital.

In April 2017, it was announced that Wieandt would work as a consultant for Corestate Capital, where he was responsible for post-merger integration and the repositioning of investments; the company eventually managed to purchase German leasing firm Hannover Leasing Group. Wieandt served as Hannover Leasing Group's Chairman of the Supervisory Board from July 2017 until January 2022.

=== Current consulting activities and board memberships ===
In July 2016, Wieandt was appointed Advisory Board Member at fintech company Debitos. German Private-Banking-Magazin editor Christian Nicolaisen believed that Wieandt was hired to support Debitos with expanding further into Europe. Since October 2018, Wieandt has been a consultant at Exporo AG, and since September 2020, he has been a HPE Growth consultant. Furthermore, Wieandt works as an Operating Partner for the company Corsair Capital and as a Senior Advisor for Jefferies Group and Orphalan S.A. In addition, he advises venture capital and private equity funds as well as financial service providers both domestically and internationally.

In early 2021, German fintech Auxmoney announced that Wieandt had joined the newly founded Strategic Advisory Council committee. Wieandt has been an independent Board Member of Auxmoney since 2012.

Wieandt is the Managing Director of Atlantic BidCo GmbH, based in Frankfurt.

=== Teaching assignments ===
From 2002 until 2005, Wieandt was a lecturer at WHU – Otto Beisheim School of Management. Since 2005, he has been an honorary professor for financial intermediation at WHU, where he has been teaching business administration and bank management. Moreover, Wieandt has been a bank management lecturer at Goethe Business School in Frankfurt am Main. In early 2016, Wieandt taught the "European Banking and the Financial Crisis" seminar at the Kellogg School of Management in Evanston (Illinois).

In addition, he regularly gives lectures on Entrepreneurial Finance at Technical University of Munich.

=== Miscellaneous ===
Since 2009, he has been a Member of the Board of Trustees and since 2023, a Member of the Foundation Council for the Cathedral of Speyer.

Since 2021, he has held the position of Chairman of the Advisory Board at the Association of Institutional Investors.

Furthermore, Wieandt is the Chairman of the Advisory Board of the Association of German Credit Market Standards e.V. (DKS).

== Works ==
=== Books ===
- Gedichte (1986). Deutscher Lyrik Verlag, Aachen 2013, ISBN 978-3-8422-4185-5
- Unfinished Business: Putting European Banks (and Europe) Back on Track, Vandenhoeck & Ruprecht, Göttingen 2017, ISBN 978-3-8471-0715-6

=== Articles ===
- (1993). "Die Enstehung von Märkten durch Innovationen". Wissenschaftliche Hochschule für Untemehmensführung.
- (1993). "Contestable markets – ein Leitbild für die Wettbewerbspolitik?" (with Harald Wiese). ORDO. 44: 185 – 202. ISBN 978-3-437-50355-9
- (1994). "Versunkene Kosten und strategische Unternehmensführung". Journal of Business Economics. 64 (8): 99 – 116.
- (1994). "Innovation and the Creation, Development and Destruction of Markets in the World machine Tool Industry". Small Business Economics. 6: 421 – 437. doi:10.1007/BF01064857
- (1994). "Biotechnology: The emerging battlefield for US and Japanese pharmaceutical companies" (with Naseem Amin). Technology Analysis & Strategic Management. 6 (4): 423 – 435.
- "Wechselwirkungen zwischen Strategie und Kapitalmarkt am Beispiel der Deutschen Bank". Hungenberg, H; Meffert, J. (2005): Handbuch Strategisches Management. ISBN 978-3-409-22312-6
- "Deutsche Bank: Auf profitables Wachstum eingestellt" (with Michael Bachschuster). Raisch, S; Probst, G; Gomez, P. (April 2007.): Wege zum Wachstum - Wie Sie nachhaltigen Unternehmenserfolg erzielen: 218 – 233. doi:10.1007/978-3-8349-8583-5
- "Neuausrichtung der Deutschland AG" (with Anna Magdalena Haslinger). Glaum, M; Hommel, U; Thomaschewski, D. (November 2007.): Internationalisierung und Unternehmenserfolg: 339 – 359. doi:10.1007/978-3-322-96501-1, ISBN 978-3-7910-2678-7
- (2008). "Herausforderung Klimawandel – Die Finanzmarktperspektive" (with Thorsten Peppler). Die Bank: 12 – 17.
- (October 2009). "Deutsche Pfandbriefbank als Immobilien- und Staatsfinanzierer". Immobilien & Finanzierung: 658 – 660.
- (2011). "Too Big to Fail? – Leçons de la crise financière" (with Sebastian Mönninghoff). Revue d'économie financière.
- (August 2011). "The Financial Crisis: Observations and Implications – The HRE Case Study" (with Sebastian C. Mönninghoff). Schmalenbachs Zeitschrift für betriebswirtschaftliche Forschung. 63: 508–530.
- (4 July 2013). "Finanzsysteme benötigt effektive Bail-in-Regulierung". Börsen-Zeitung.
- (2013). "The Future of Peer-to-Peer Finance". Schmalenbachs Zeitschrift für betriebswirtschaftliche Forschung. 65: 455-487
- (26 November 2013). "Rettung verboten". Handelsblatt, No. 228: 23.
- (24 July 2014). "Staatliche Bankenrettung muss verboten werden". Börsen-Zeitung, No. 139: 3.
- (March 2015). "Strategische Herausforderungen für Europas Banken". Die Bank: 28-32.
- (2017). "Non-Performing Loans – eine zentrale Herausforderung für die europäischen Banken". Zeitschrift für das gesamte Kreditwesen, 70: 36-39.
- (11 September 2018). "Die Währungsunion ist noch nicht vollständig". Börsen-Zeitung, No. 174: 2.
- (27 March 2020). "Ein digitaler Euro für eine digitale Welt". Börsen-Zeitung, No. 6: 8.
- (4 December 2020). "Krypotwährungen und die Folgen für europäische Banken". Frankfurter Allgemeine Zeitung, No. 283: 29.
- (23 April 2021). "It’s Time for Central Banks to Start Issuing Their Own Digital Currencies. Yes, Even the Fed". Kellogg Insight.
- (17 June 2021). "Können dezentrale Blockchain-Protokolle Banken ersetzen?". Frankfurter Allgemeine Zeitung, No. 137: 27.
- (28 March 2022). "Centralized and decentralized finance: Coexistence or convergence?" (with Laurenz Heppding). SSRN, doi:10.2139/ssrn.4046173
- (16 May 2022). "The economics of banking regulation in Europe: does the post-GFC bail-in regime effectively eliminate implicit government guarantees?" (with Sascha Hahn, Paul P. Momtaz). The European Journal of Finance, 29: 7, 700–725. doi:10.1080/1351847X.2022.2058882
