= MT940 =

Message format used by the SWIFT network

MT940 is a specific SWIFT message type used by the SWIFT network to send and receive end-of-day bank account statements.

Message Type 940 is the SWIFT standard (Banking Communication Standard) for the electronic transmission of account statement data. In various online banking programs, MT940 is used as an interface to other programs (e.g. for accounting), with which the account statement data are processed further.

The MT formats (Message Types, MT) currently used in the SWIFT community, which also include MT940, are to be replaced in the long term by the XML formats described in the ISO 20022 standard to achieve global unification (see also de:Camt-Format).
