= Hamburg Commercial Bank =

Commercial bank

Hamburg Commercial Bank AG
- Type: Aktiengesellschaft
- Industry: Banking
- Founded: 2018
- Headquarters: Hamburg, Germany
- Number of employees: 1012 FTE globally (30/06/2024)
- Website: www.hcob-bank.com

Hamburg Commercial Bank (formerly HSH Nordbank) is a commercial bank in northern Europe with headquarters in Hamburg as well as Kiel, Germany. It is active in corporate and private banking. Considered to be the world's largest provider of maritime finance, its main focus is on shipping, transportation, real estate and renewable energy. The bank is one of the pioneers in the pan-European project financing of renewable energies and is also involved in the expansion of digital infrastructure.

In 2022, the bank won the "World's Best Bank Transformation" award by Euromoney trade magazine. For the third year in a row, The bank was awarded as "Best Performing Bank" in Germany by The Banker.

The bank changed its name from HSH Nordbank to Hamburg Commercial Bank (HCOB) on February 4, 2019, after the bank was sold to new owners in 2018. HCOB has foreign offices in Athens and other operations in Luxembourg and London.

HSH Nordbank, then HCOB has been designated as a Significant Institution since the entry into force of European Banking Supervision in late 2014, and as a consequence is directly supervised by the European Central Bank.

== History ==
=== Early beginnings ===
HSH Nordbank was created as a result of a merger between Hamburgische Landesbank and Landesbank Schleswig-Holstein on June 2, 2003. In the course of the merger HSH was transformed into a joint-stock company (Aktiengesellschaft) and thereby formally privatised, i.e. the bank is not anymore governed by public law. In 2003, the bank had a balance sheet total of 172 billion euros and employed 4,500 people.

In 2006, HSH Nordbank pledged to seek an unprecedented stock market listing, edging out its chief executive Alexander Stuhlmann to prepare the way. Shortly after, WestLB agreed to sell its 26.6 per cent stake in HSH Nordbank to a consortium of five institutional investors, led by J.C. Flowers & Co., for 1.25 billion euros. Flowers had competed with three investors – Cerberus Capital Management, Hellman & Friedman, and Corsair Capital – for the stake. The investment marked the first part-privatisation of a Landesbank and its experience was being closely watched as an indicator of how difficult it would be for others to prise open the state-controlled sector. By 2008, J.C. Flowers injected about 300 million euros of fresh equity, in spite of the bank's failure to have an initial public offering that year.

=== 2008 financial crisis ===
Similarly to peers such as NORD/LB, Commerzbank, Deutsche Hypothekenbank and KfW, HSH Nordbank buckled under excessive risk-taking prior to the 2008 financial crisis, when it had sought to expand beyond its roots as a regional lender to companies and savings banks into global capital markets. It had done so in anticipation of the expiry of a rule that allowed for generous refinancing of German state-backed banks. With the beginning of the crisis, HSH had to report losses on their credit investment portfolio. In September 2008 HSH Nordbank announced further writedowns. As a direct consequence the CEO Hans Berger stepped down and in the following weeks HSH announced restructuring. Branches in Copenhagen and Hong Kong were reduced to representations and new business was focused on the core region in northern Germany.

In December 2008, HSH Nordbank was granted to issue up to 30 billion euros guaranteed notes under the German SoFFin program. One requirement that was imposed on HSH was to raise the capital ratio to at least 8%. On January 20, 2009, 3 billion euros 3-year guaranteed notes were issued. On February 24, 2009, HSH received new capital of EUR 3 billion and credit guarantees of 10 billion euros by the two main shareholders, the states of Hamburg and Schleswig-Holstein. The other shareholders, JC Flowers and the Savings Banks Association of Schleswig-Holstein, did not participate in the capital infusion. Together with this increase of its core-capital, HSH announced further restructuring. It planned to spin off non-strategic activities and the toxic asset portfolio into a—yet to be created—bad bank.

In 2008, HSH Nordbank filed a claim with the New York Supreme Court against UBS over losses it says it suffered on a $500 million portfolio of collateralized debt obligations linked to the U.S. mortgage market. By 2012, the court found that HSH should have been able to conduct its own due diligence and dismissed the fraud claim, a decision that lawyers interpreted as having broader implications for investors seeking damages for losses incurred during the 2008 financial crisis.

On April 9, 2009, president of supervisory board Wolfgang Peiner appointed Freshfields Bruckhaus Deringer to investigate recent management decisions of the Vorstand. On April 17, 2009, the supervisory board of HSH Nordbank relieved Frank Roth, member of the management board of his duties and started pressing criminal charges against him. The bank claims that Roth leaked strictly confidential information to outside parties.

In May 2009 Standard & Poor's downgraded HSH to BBB+.

On October 13, 2009, Norddeutscher Rundfunk reported on a questionable CDO deal codenamed "Omega 55" between HSH Nordbank and BNP Paribas in late 2007, that eventually cost HSH Nordbank 500 million euros. Parts of that deal were not disclosed to the German Federal Financial Supervisory Authority (BaFin). Omega 55 was a hybrid CDO which exposed HSH Nordbank to the risks of default of other financial institutions including the now bankrupt Lehman Brothers and Washington Mutual. However, also included in the deal were several billion euros of risk tied to HSH Nordbank's own assets. It is alleged that he inclusion of this last element allowed HSH Nordbank to move several billions of risky assets off its balance sheet at year end and avoid costly capital reserves which BaFin would require the bank to post. The assets were repurchased several weeks later after auditors had closed the books of the bank for the year.

In 2012 the Hamburg Public Prosecutors filed charges against six former HSH Nordbank Directors, including the former CEO Dirk Jens Nonnenmacher, in relation to the Omega 55 transaction. The indictment ran to over 600 pages long. They were accused of breach of trust and accounting fraud. The charges were dismissed in 2014. However, that acquittal was overturned by the Federal Court of Justice in October 2016 and a new trial scheduled before the Hamburg District Court. In June 2019, five of the ex-directors settled the charges against them via the "payment of money". The ex-directors had to make individual payments of between 500 thousand and 1.6 million euros to settle the charges.

In 2009, HSH Nordbank had a balance sheet of 174.5 billion euros and reported a loss of 678 million euros.

In 2010, HSH Nordbank was again caught up in scandal. Its CEO, Jens Nonnenmacher, and its General Counsel, Wolfgang Gossman, were accused of planting child pornography on the office computer of the then Head of its New York Branch. The child pornography was planted to give the bank an excuse to fire the branch head. United States prosecutors originally moved against the branch head but rescinded the allegations when certain evidence did not hold up. The bank settled this scandal through a reported settlement of 7 million US dollars after the bank's supervisory board hired law firm WilmerHale to conduct an investigation. The management board of the bank also issued an apology to the former branch head in 2011.

=== Restructuring and Cum-Ex Scandal 2013–2018 ===
The European Commission, HSH Nordbank and its owners negotiated for years over a plan to restore the bank to health and avoid future state aid. In September 2011, all sides reached a settlement with the European Commission, ending state aid proceedings in return for tough limits on the size of the bank's balance sheet and a one-off financial penalty of 500 million euros. Under the settlement, the bank was to pull out of asset-backed aviation finance and to limit property finance to its home market by 2014. It also included plans to reduce its staff from 3,300 to 2,100. For 2013, the bank presented its worst set of results since 2008, with an annual net loss close to 800 million euros.

In 2015, Minister-President Torsten Albig of Schleswig-Holstein and First Mayor of Hamburg Olaf Scholz negotiated a restructuring deal with the European Commission that allowed HSH Nordbank to offload 6.2 billion euros in troubled assets – mainly non-performing ship loans – onto its government majority owners and avoid being shut down, saving around 2,500 jobs. The agreement stipulated that if no private-sector buyer emerged by 2018, HSH Nordbank had to be wound down.

The European Commission approved a bailout in March 2016 and HSH asked investment bank UBS to find buyers for the loans which were extended to shipping and aircraft companies and for real estate and renewable energy projects. In an initial deal, Macquarie Bank and Merrill Lynch bought 800 million euros in aviation loans and 540 million euros in real estate credits, respectively.

In 2013, HSH announced that it was taking provisions of 127 million euros in relation to illegal securities transactions, cum-ex dividend trades, after the findings of an investigatory report by the law firm Clifford Chance. HSH's involvement in cum-ex dividend trades were to follow the bank throughout the years up to 2017

=== Privatization, Lawsuits and the Return of the Cum-Ex Scandal 2018–2019 ===
In mid-2016, the bank's owners hired Citigroup to organize the process to privatize HSH Nordbank under European state-aid rules by the end of February 2018. Over the course of 2017, Apollo Global Management of the United States as well as Anbang Insurance Group,HNA Group and ICBC of China were considered as interested buyers but ultimately did not submit a bid for the bank. By the end of the year, bids were submitted by Apollo, Socrates and a consortium of private equity groups Cerberus Capital Management and J.C. Flowers.

In February 2018, the state governments of Schleswig-Holstein and Hamburg – at the time led by Daniel Günther and Olaf Scholz – agreed to sell their shares for an estimated 1 billion euros to a group of private equity investors led by Cerberus and JC Flowers. Other funds involved were GoldenTree Asset Management and Centaurus. In addition, Austrian bank BAWAG also contributed. The transaction also saw the bank's non-performing loan portfolio, principally shipping-related, sold to a special purpose vehicle set up by Cerberus, JC Flowers, GoldenTree and Centaurus at a price below its current book value. The sale of shares is subject to the approval of the European Commission and the European Central Bank. After its privatization, HSH Nordbank will also have to leave the deposit insurance scheme of Germany's publicly owned banks and join the private sector plan.

Hamburg and Schleswig-Holstein later said that total losses they incurred in their HSH investment would range from 10.8 billion to a maximum of 14 billion euros.

In January 2019 a group of 18 bond investors sued HSH Nordbank for 1.4 billion euros, accusing the bank of improperly lowering the book value of its Tier One capital instruments via accounting actions the bank took prior to and during the 2018 sales process. Earlier, in relation to that same lawsuit, the investor group had filed a 1782 discovery request in the United States Court system asking to be allowed to serve subpoenas on the bank's new owners; Cerberus, JC Flowers and Goldentree Asset Management. The 1782 request seeks information related to the NPL portfolio sale and share sale. In their initial motion, plaintiffs stated "The inside nature of the NPL Portfolio Sale, and the decision to sell HSH and the NPL Portfolio (at a deep discount to book value) to virtually the same investor consortium, strongly suggest severe irregularities in both the Bank Sale and the NPL Portfolio Sale transactions." The Court granted the request at the end of 2018. The decision is currently under appeal. On October 4, 2019, the court lifted the stay that had been placed over the production of documents in the 1782 case. The plaintiffs are free to begin discovery even while the 1782 case is under appeal This lawsuit is in addition to earlier lawsuits filed by the insurance companies Talanx, Huk-Coburg and Baloise in May 2018 over the same issues. Those lawsuits seeks damages of over euro 285 million. In December 2019, HCOB settled with the group of bondholders that had sued it in January 2019.

In September 2019, the Cum-Ex scandal returned in force for the German Banking industry as an ex-British banker, who had been charged with fraud in relation to the schemes, agreed to testify and explain the inner working and participants in these transactions in the Bonn District Court. On his first day of testimony the banker only referred to as Martin S. went into detail on how the transactions worked to defraud the German Treasury by making it appear that one set of stock securities had more than one owner. These multiple owners would all then file for tax refund reimbursements related to the dividends received from the underlying stock. Martin then went on to name the biggest players in the scandal of who he was aware. He named Hypo-Vereinsbank, Commerzbank, HSH Nordbank, WestLB and Deutsche Bank as those players. The trial of Martin S. " is the first in a wider investigation aimed at recovering billions from banks who profited from a scheme, described by finance minister Olaf Scholz, as a 'scandal' which Germany estimates cost it more than 5 billion euros." On 14 October 2019, Handlesblatt Online reported for the first time that Hamburg Commercial Bank's current CEO, Stephan Ermisch, may have personal exposure for restitution that may need to be paid back to the German Government in relation to cum-ex trading. His exposure owes to the fact that Ermisch had oversight of the departments at Hypo-Vereinsbank (his previous employer) which engaged in cum-ex trading and the bank is now seeking compensation from three ex-committee members in an amount of 110mm euros. There is a chance that these ex-committee members, in turn, will make a claim against Ermisch. The article also claims that at the time HSH's own misdeeds in relation to cum-ex trading came to light, the Hanseatic state government showed no zeal to actually investigate the bank at that time. However, currently the Cum-ex scandal is being actively pursued by prosecutors in the city of Cologne who are showing much more zeal in pursuing banks that engaged in the illegal stock maneuvers. It was further reported by many German newspapers that the Cologne Prosecutors Office now has over 400 individuals in its investigative sights, including two former HSH Nordbank managers. The investigation also has many financial institutions as targets, including HCOB. Spokespeople for HCOB say that they consider the matter resolved via their previous payments of 127mm euro. However, it is unclear whether the Cologne Prosecutors Office will again be investigating HCOB in relation to its participation in the scandal and whether more charges and penalties might be forthcoming. The articles now estimate the scandal cost the German Treasury approximately 12 billion euros.

== Company ==
=== Management ===
The members of the Board of Managing Directors of Hamburg Commercial Bank are:

- Stefan Ermisch, (chairman of the board of Managing Directors) since June 10, 2016 (previously, since December 1, 2012, chief financial officer)
- Ulrik Lackschewitz (Chief Risk Officer since October 1, 2015, and Deputy chairman of the board of Managing Directors since December 10, 2018)
- Ian Banwell (since April 1, 2019, chief financial officer since September 1, 2020)
- Nicolas Blanchard (since December 10, 2018, still until the end of 2021)
- Christopher Brody (Chief Investment Officer since July 1, 2019).

As reported by Hamburger Abendblatt in April 2020, the remuneration of the Executive Board was quintupled from €3.5 million for 2018 to €18.9 million for 2019. According to the report, the new Executive Board members Brody and Banwell will each receive between four and five million euros a year, including bonuses.

=== Ownership ===
After the sale of HSH Nordbank in 2018 the shareholders in the institution are:

| Owner | Share |
|---|---|
| Cerberus Capital Management L.P. | 42.50% |
| J.C. Flowers LLC | 35% |
| Goldentree Asset Management L.P. | 12.50% |
| Centaurus Capital L.P. | 7.5% |
| Bawag P.S.K. | 2.5% |

== See also ==
- List of banks in the euro area
- List of banks in Germany
