= Delivery versus payment =

Common form of settlement for securities

Delivery versus payment (DvP) is a common form of settlement for securities. The process involves the simultaneous delivery of all documents necessary to give effect to a transfer of securities in exchange for the receipt of the stipulated payment amount. Alternatively, it may involve transfers of two securities in such a way as to ensure that delivery of one security occurs if and only if the corresponding delivery of the other security occurs.

In foreign exchange, it is called payment versus payment (PvP) instead, but the concept is essentially the same. PvP settlement ensures that both sides settles the currency to be traded simultaneously.

This is done to avoid settlement risk such as where one party fails to deliver the security when the other party has already delivered the cash when settling a securities trade.

== History ==
The market crash of October 1987 drew global attention to potential weaknesses in the standards applied for clearance and settlement. Numerous studies resulted, among which was one from the Group of Thirty which pioneered standards for providers of securities settlement services. The report included nine recommendations, one of which was that "Delivery versus payment (DvP) should be the method for settling all securities transactions with systems in place by 1992."

In December 1990, the Committee on Payment and Settlement Systems (CPSS), consisting of representatives from the major central banks, initiated further study of DVP. Its report in September 1992 found three ways of achieving DvP:

1. Transfer of securities and funds done on a trade-by-trade basis, with final transfer of securities occurring at the same time as the final transfer of funds;
2. Transfer of securities on a gross basis, with final transfer of securities occurring throughout the day, but funds transfer on a net basis at the end of the day;
3. Transfer of both securities and funds on a net basis, with final transfers occurring at the end of the day.

== Operational perspective ==
From an operational perspective DVP is a sale transaction of negotiable securities (in exchange for cash payment) that can be instructed to a settlement agent using SWIFT Message Type MT 543 (in the ISO15022 standard). Use of such standard message types is intended to reduce risk in the settlement of a financial transaction, and enable automatic processing. Ideally, title to an asset and payment are exchanged simultaneously. This may be possible in many cases such as in a central depository system such as the United States Depository Trust & Clearing Corporation.

== Non-DvP ==
Non-DvP settlement processes typically expose the parties to settlement risk. They are known by a variety of names, including free delivery, free of payment or FOP delivery, or in the United States, delivery versus free. FOP settlement involves delivery of the securities without a simultaneous transfer of funds – hence 'free of payment'. Funds may either be remitted by other, mutually agreed means, or payment may not be made at all. This is the case in the transfer of securities gifted or inherited, or, in a country retaining paper securities certificates, in the dematerialisation of such securities, by transfer FOP into the name of the electronic custodian, with beneficial ownership retained by the transferor.

== See also ==
- Herstatt Bank
- ISO 15022
- Settlement date
- Securities market participants (United States)
- T+2
