= Aareal Bank =

German financial services company

Aareal Bank AG
- Type: Public (Aktiengesellschaft)
- Traded as: FWB: ARL; MDAX component
- ISIN: DE0005408116
- Industry: Financial services
- Founded: 1922; 104 years ago
- Headquarters: Wiesbaden, Germany
- Key people: Christian Ricken; (chairman of the management board, CEO); Jean Pierre Mustier; (chairman of the supervisory board)
- Products: Structured Property Finance and Consulting Services for the housing sector
- Total assets: €45.5 billion (2020)
- Owner: Atlantic BidCo GmbH; (2023–present)
- Number of employees: 2,982
- Website: www.aareal-bank.com

Aareal Bank AG is an international company listed on the MDAX index with headquarters in Wiesbaden, Germany, which traded as DePfa Deutsche Bau- und Bodenbank AG and formed part of the DePfa Gruppe until 2002.

The company is represented on three continents (Europe, North America and the Asia-Pacific region) and oversees property financing in more than 20 countries. It has been listed on the German stock exchange since 2002.

In 2023, Atlantic BidCo GmbH (ABC) took control of Aareal Bank after a public takeover offer was completed. ABC is a company formed by a group of investors led by Advent International, Centerbridge Partners and a subsidiary of CPP Investments.

Aareal has been designated as a Significant Institution since the entry into force of European Banking Supervision in late 2014, and as a consequence is directly supervised by the European Central Bank.

== History ==
The company's history dates back to two institutions: Preußische Landespfandbriefanstalt (founded in 1922) and Deutsche Wohnstättenbank AG (founded in 1923), both of which were based in Berlin. Deutsche Wohnstättenbank AG was renamed Deutsche Bau- und Bodenbank in 1926.

In the years of the Nazi rule, the bank grew rapidly thanks to the bridging loan business which mainly targeted the funding of settlement and housing construction. These sectors boomed following the massive increase of the armament industry that demanded accommodation for their workers, often designed as National Socialist ideal settlements. The prospect of business opportunities due to the boom of the armament industry also fostered the bank's department for industrial loans. Millions of Reichsmark were granted to companies like Ruhrgas AG, Vereinigte Stahlwerke AG or Daimler-Benz AG. At the time of the Nazi seizure of power in 1933, already 63 of 267 employees belonged to the Nazi Party. While chairman of the supervisory board Otto Kämper was a member as well and publicly praised the success of the government in the field of housing, democrats such as Arnold Knoblauch or Eberhard Wildermuth, who was in contact with conspirators of the 20 July plot, were still holding a seat on the supervisory board until World War II.

Preußische Landespfandbriefanstalt was given the name Deutsche Pfandbriefanstalt in 1954. In 1979, Deutsche Pfandbriefanstalt acquired a majority interest in Deutsche Bau- und Bodenbank. It traded as public limited company under the name Deutsche Pfandbrief- und Hypothekenbank AG from 1989, before going public in 1991 and opening its first foreign branch in Amsterdam in the same year.

In 1999, Deutsche Pfandbrief- und Hypothekenbank AG was renamed DePfa Deutsche Pfandbrief Bank AG and transferred all property activities to Deutsche Bau- und Bodenbank, which was also given the name DePfa Bank AG BauBoden at this time. In 2002, the bank was divided into Aareal Bank AG (formerly Deutsche Bau- und Bodenbank), a property finance bank with headquarters in Wiesbaden, and DePfa BANK plc, a public finance bank based in Dublin. Since 2006, the company has focused on the Commercial Property Financing and Consulting/Services segments.

== Bodies ==
Hermann J. Merkens has been chairman of the management board of the company since 2015. The supervisory board members are elected for a period of five years each. The current term of Marija Korsch as chairman of the supervisory board began in 2013.

== Shareholder structure ==
100%	Free float

(as of 31 December 2015)

== Subsidiaries ==
The Aareal Bank Group includes the following companies:

Company	Description	Registered office	Capital share
Aareal Bank Asia Limited	Financings for office buildings, hotels, logistics facilities, retail properties and residential properties in selected markets	Singapore	100 %
Aareal Capital Corporation	Financings for office buildings, hotels, logistics facilities, retail properties and residential properties in selected markets	New York	100 %
Aareal Estate AG	Management and consultancy firm for commercial properties in Germany and abroad	Wiesbaden	100 %
Aareal First Financial Solutions AG	Development and implementation of payment transaction solutions for Aareal Bank	Mainz	100 %
Aareal Valuation GmbH	Valuation company	Wiesbaden	100 %
Aareon AG	Europe-wide consultancy and IT systems house for the property sector	Mainz	70 %
Deutsche Bau- und Grundstuecks-Aktiengesellschaft	Specialist property management service provider; real estate asset management service provider for institutional and private investors, municipalities and the Federal Government	Bonn	100 %
Deutsche Structured Finance GmbH	Structuring, launching and placing, as well as subsequently managing closed-end funds, particularly involving property investments	Wiesbaden	100 %
plusForta GmbH	Specialists in online sales of deposit guarantee insurance product	Düsseldorf	100 %
Westdeutsche ImmobilienBank AG	Specialist bank that focuses on commercial real estate financing	Mainz	100 %

== See also ==
- List of banks in the euro area
- List of banks in Germany
