= ISO 15022 =

ISO standard

ISO 15022 is an ISO standard for securities messaging used in transactions between financial institutions. Participants in the financial industry need a common representation of the financial transactions they perform and this standard defines general message schema, which in turn are used by organizations to define messages in a complete and unambiguous way. This results in efficiency, lower costs, and the avoidance of errors. Prior to standardization in this area, there were overlapping standards, or ad hoc approaches where there was a functional gap and no standard.

== Transition from ISO 7775 to ISO 15022 ==
ISO 15022 replaces the previous securities messaging standard ISO 7775. It provides two syntaxes: one compatible with the preceding standards, and one fairly compatible with EDIFACT. ISO 20022 is the successor to ISO 15022.

SWIFT is the registration authority for ISO 15022. In SWIFT financial messages, the standard is applied to variety of message types.

ISO 15022 was developed in 1992, in London, to provide the securities industry with a better tool to create message standards. The previous standard ISO 7775 contained the actual message standards themselves (like the SWIFT message types MT 520 or MT 534), which did not make it easy to make changes to these standards (because each time one needs to pass a number of time-consuming standard cycles). To avoid this, ISO 15022 does not contain the actual messages, but contains a set of rules and guidelines to build messages. If these rules and guidelines are adhered to (checked by the registration authority) the resulting message (format) is automatically an ISO 15022-compliant standard. Examples are the MT103, MT202 Cov, MT540, MT542, MT548, etc.

== Parts ==
ISO 15022 is split into two parts:

- ISO 15022-1:1999 Securities -- Scheme for messages (Data Field Dictionary) -- Part 1: Data field and message design rules and guidelines
- ISO 15022-2:1999 Securities -- Scheme for messages (Data Field Dictionary) -- Part 2: Maintenance of the Data Field Dictionary and Catalogue of Messages

== See also ==
- ISO 20022
- SWIFT
