= Settlement risk =

Risk that a party fails to deliver

Settlement risk, also known as delivery risk or counterparty risk, is the risk that a counterparty (or intermediary agent) fails to deliver a security or its value in cash as per agreement after the first party has delivered the security or cash value. The term covers factors incidental to the settlement process that may suspend or prevent a trade from completing, even should the parties themselves be in agreement, act in good faith, and are otherwise competent to perform.

The term applies only to risks inherent to the settlement method of a particular transaction. Broader risks of trading such as political risk or systemic risk may interrupt markets and prevent settlement, but these are not settlement risk per se.

== Herstatt risk ==
One form of settlement risk is foreign exchange settlement risk or cross-currency settlement risk, sometimes called Herstatt risk after a notable incident in which the German bank failed due to trading risks. On 26 June 1974, the bank's license was withdrawn by German regulators at the end of the banking day (4:30pm local time) because of a lack of capital to cover liabilities that were due. Some banks had undertaken foreign exchange transactions with Herstatt and had already paid Deutsche Marks to the bank during the day, believing they would receive US dollars later that day in the US from Herstatt's US nostro. But after 3:30 pm in Germany and 10:30 am in New York, Herstatt stopped all dollar payments to counterparties, leaving the counterparties unable to collect their payment.

The closing of Drexel Burnham Lambert in 1990 was prevented from causing similar problems because the Bank of England had set up a special scheme which ensured that payments were completed. The collapse of Barings Bank in 1995 resulted in minor losses for counterparties in the foreign exchange market because of a specific complexity in the ECU clearing system.

== Mitigation ==
Settlement risk may be mitigated through various techniques, including:

- Limits on the amount of transactions to settle with each counterparty on a given day to avoid developing a large exposure to a single counterparty;
- Settlement through a clearing house to reduce exposure and liquidity required by netting transactions (bilateral or multilateral);
- Requirement of initial margin deposits (also called "collateral deposits") and variation margin to provide a safety buffer;
- Provide independent valuation of trades and collateral and monitor the creditworthiness of the parties to enhance transparency and risk management;
- Set up a guarantee fund that can be used to cover losses that exceed a defaulting member's collateral on deposit;
- Settlement through a central counterparty clearing to mutualize or transfer the settlement risk (cf. novation);
- Settlement via Delivery versus payment or Payment versus payment mechanism;
- Settling foreign exchange via a special-purpose entity, such as the CLS Group;
- Settling via a cryptographic consensus system, such as a blockchain.
