= Nomura =

Nomura (written: 野村 "field village" or 埜村 "wilderness village") is a Japanese surname.

Notable people with the surname include:

- Asuka Nomura (野村 明日香; born 1994), Japanese volleyball player
- Don Nomura (団 野村; born 1957), Japanese-American baseball agent
- Katsuhiro Nomura (野村 勝人), Japanese voice actor, including in the manga series Living for the Day After Tomorrow
- Katsunori Nomura (野村 克則; born 1973), Japanese baseball player and coach
- Katsuya Nomura (野村 克也; 1935–2020), Japanese baseball player and manager
- Ken Nomura (野村 謙; born 1965), Japanese D1 Grand Prix Driver
- Kenji Nomura (乃村 健次; born 1970), Japanese voice actor
- Kenjiro Nomura (disambiguation), multiple people
- Kichisaburō Nomura (野村 吉三郎; 1877–1964), Japanese admiral in the Imperial Japanese Navy and the ambassador to the United States until the attack on Pearl Harbor
- Kodō Nomura (野村 胡堂; 1882–1963), pen-name of Japanese writer Osakazu Nomura, a novelist and music critic in Showa period Japan
- Kunichi Nomura (野村 訓市; born 1974), Japanese writer, actor, radio personality, book editor, interior designer, creative director, and DJ
- Mami Nomura (野村 真美; born 1964), Japanese actress
- Mary Nomura (1925–2026), Japanese-American singer, "the songbird of Manzanar"
- Masayasu Nomura (野村 眞康; 1927–2011), Japanese-American biochemist who made seminal contributions in the field of RNA biology
- Mayuka Nomura (野村 真悠華; born 1989), Japanese voice actress
- Michiko Nomura (野村 道子; born 1938), Japanese voice actress
- Misu Nomura (野村 ミス; 1896–1979), Japanese politician
- Mizuki Nomura (野村 美月), Japanese light novelist
- Mutsuhiko Nomura (野村 六彦; born 1940), Japanese footballer and manager
- Naokuni Nomura (野村 直邦; 1885–1973), Japanese admiral and naval attaché to Nazi Germany
- Ryutaro Nomura (野村 龍太郎; 1859–1943), Japanese businessman
- Satoru Nomura (野村 悟; born 1946), Japanese Yakuza leader
- Sayo Nomura (野村 沙世; born 1989), Japanese long-distance runner
- Shin Nomura (野村 伸; born 1955), Japanese manga artist
- Shūsuke Nomura (野村 秋介; 1935–1993), Japanese activist
- Tadahiro Nomura (野村 忠宏; born 1974), Japanese Judo competitor
- Takahito Nomura (野村 貴仁; born 1969), Japanese baseball player
- Takashi Nomura (野村 孝; 1927–2015), Japanese film director
- Tatsuji Nomura (野村 達次; 1922–2013), Japanese scientist; pioneer in the development of laboratory animals for biomedical researches
- Tetsuya Nomura (野村 哲也; born 1970), Japanese game and character designer; works at Square Enix
- Tokushichi Nomura II (野村 徳七 二代; 1878–1945), Japanese businessman; founder of the Nomura zaibatsu
- Tomohiro Nomura (野村 智宏; born 1975), Japanese high jumper
- Toshiro Nomura (野村 敏郎; born 1954), Japanese astronomer
- Toyokazu Nomura (野村 豊和; born 1949), Japanese judoka
- Yasunori Nomura (野村 泰紀; born 1974), Japanese theoretical physicist
- Yasushi Nomura (野村 靖; 1842–1909), Japanese politician and cabinet minister
- Yoshio Nomura (野村 義男; born 1964), Japanese idol, musician and actor
- Yoshitarō Nomura (野村 芳太郎; 1919–2005), Japanese film director
- Yozo Nomura (野村 洋三; 1869-1965), Japanese businessman and proprietor of the Samurai Shokai company
- Yuka Nomura (野村 佑香; born 1984), Japanese actress
- Inoue Masaru (bureaucrat) (井上 勝; 1843–1910), Japanese bureaucrat; "Father of the Japanese Railways"; briefly bore the name Yakichi Nomura (野村弥吉)

== Fictional characters ==
- Tomoko Nomura (野村 朋子), a character from the manga and anime series Great Teacher Onizuka

== See also ==
- Nomura Holdings
- Nomura Securities
- Nomura, Ehime, former town in Ehime Prefecture, Japan
- Nomura Research Institute
- Nomura's jellyfish
- Namoura, another name for the pastry basbousa
- Namora, a character from Marvel Comics
