= Herstatt Bank =

Defunct German bank

- Company type: Private
- Industry: Banking
- Headquarters: Cologne, Germany
- Area served: Worldwide
- Products: Consumer banking

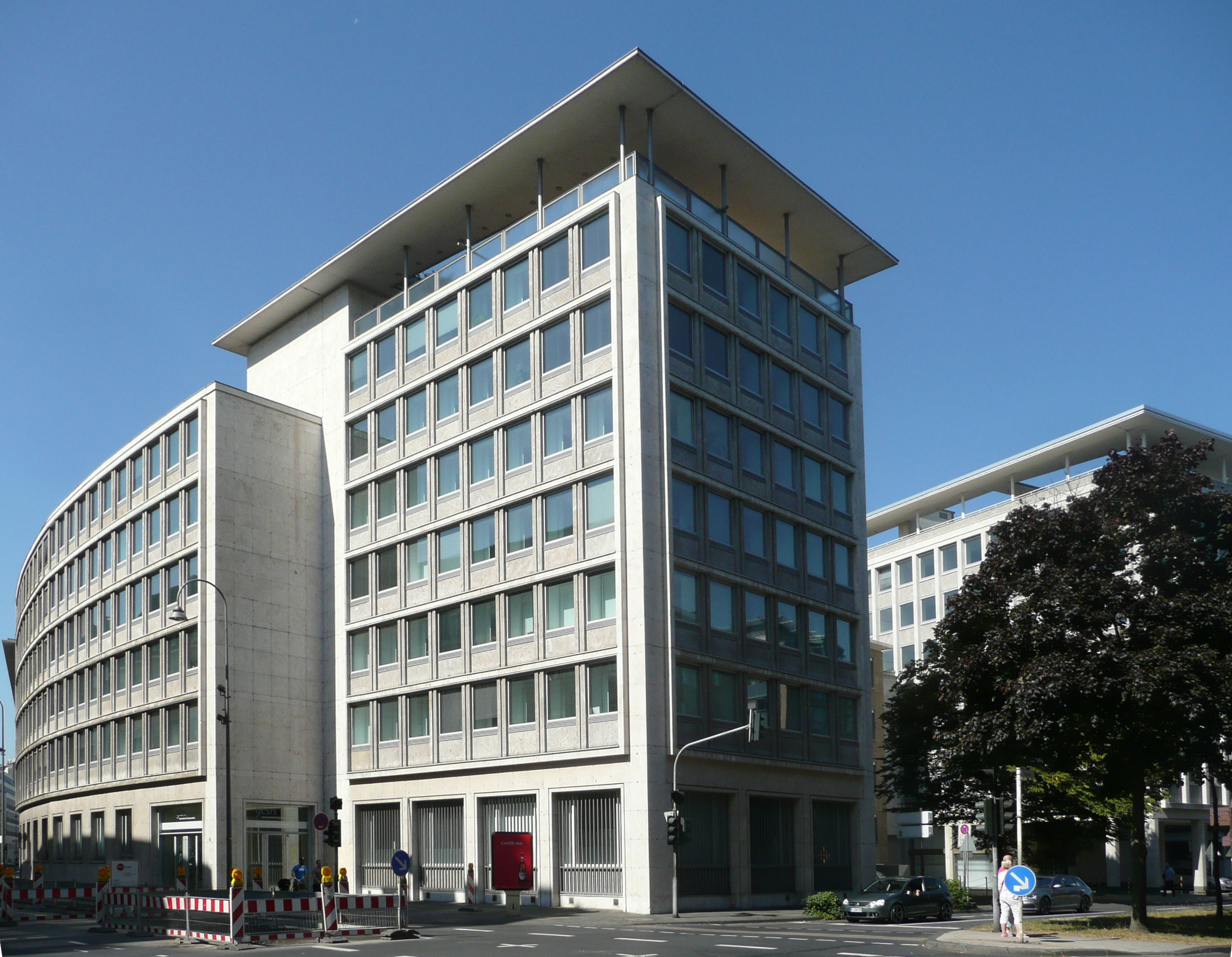
Former offices of Herstatt Bank, Cologne

Herstatt Bank (Bankhaus I.D. Herstatt K.G.a.A.) was a privately owned bank in the German city of Cologne. It went bankrupt on 26 June 1974, an event widely referred to as the Herstatt crisis. Herstatt's failure specifically highlighted the importance of settlement risk in foreign-exchange markets, which became correspondingly known as Herstatt risk.

The Herstatt crisis had important policy consequences. In the subsequent months of 1974, Germany established the Liquidity Consortium Bank and, at the international level, central bankers created the Basel Committee on Banking Supervision. With considerably more delay, concerns about Herstatt risk were revived in the late 1980s and 1990s and resulted in the creation of CLS Bank, operational since 2002 as a global foreign exchange market settlement utility.

== Background ==
Herstatt Bank was founded in 1955 by Ivan David Herstatt, with financial assistance from Herbert Quandt, Emil Bührle and Hans Gerling, the head of an insurance company who took a majority share. By 1974 the bank had assets of over DM2 billion, making it the 35th largest bank in Germany. Herstatt Bank became a significant participant in the foreign exchange markets. During 1973 and 1974, the U.S. dollar experienced significant volatility. The bank made wrong bets on the direction of the dollar, and by June 1974 had accumulated DM470 million in losses, compared with capital of only DM44 million.

== Crisis and liquidation ==
On 26 June 1974, German regulators forced the troubled Bank Herstatt into liquidation. That day, a number of banks had released payment of Deutsche Marks (DEM) to Herstatt in Frankfurt in exchange for US dollars (USD) that were to be delivered in New York. The bank was closed at 16:30 German time, which was 10:30 New York time. Because of time zone differences, Herstatt ceased operations between the times of the respective payments. The counterparty banks did not receive their USD payments.

== Aftermath and policy legacy ==
Responding to the cross-jurisdictional implications of the Herstatt debacle, the eleven members of the G-10, Luxembourg and Spain formed a standing committee under the auspices of the Bank for International Settlements (BIS). The committee, named the Basel Committee on Banking Supervision, comprises representatives from central banks and regulatory authorities. This type of settlement risk, in which one party in a foreign exchange trade pays out the currency it sold but does not receive the currency it bought, is often called Herstatt risk.

The failure of Herstatt Bank was a key factor that led to the worldwide implementation of real-time gross settlement (RTGS) systems, which ensure that payments between one bank and another are executed in real-time and are considered final. The work on these issues was coordinated by the Basel Committee on Banking Supervision under the Bank for International Settlements.

The Continuous Linked Settlement (CLS) bank and system was launched almost 30 years later in 2002. This payment versus payment (PVP) process enables member banks to trade foreign currencies without assuming the settlement risk associated with the process, whereby a counterparty could fail before delivering their leg of the transaction.

== See also ==
- Long-Term Capital Management
- Bankruptcy of Lehman Brothers
- List of banks in Germany
