= Liquidity Consortium Bank =

Former German policy bank

The Liquidity Consortium Bank (German: Liquiditäts-Konsortialbank GmbH, also known as LiKo-Bank) was a specialized financial institution in Germany. It was established in 1974 at the initiative of the Deutsche Bundesbank following the collapse of Herstatt Bank. It lost its purpose as a consequence of European monetary union, and was eventually liquidated in 2014-2015.

== Overview ==
LiKo-Bank's purpose was to provide liquidity to solvent banks that found themselves in situations of liquidity stress, in order to support stability to the domestic and international payments system. The liquidity was provided by buying high-quality claims held by the bank that would not be eligible as collateral for central bank liquidity, in exchange for central bank-eligible bills of exchange. The LiKo-Bank had access to a rediscount line at the Bundesbank of up to 1.1 billion Deutsche Mark.

The Bundesbank held 30 percent of the LiKo-Bank's capital, with the rest owned by the three main German banking associations (BdB, BVR and DSGV) and specialized financial institutions. The bank's supervisory board included the President of the Bundesbank and representatives from the German banking associations. Its co-managers (German: Geschäftsführer) were the co-managers of AKA Ausfuhrkredit, a private-sector export credit institution which managed all of the LiKo-Bank's operations.

In practice, the LiKo-Bank acted as lender of last resort for the German banking sector, a role that was not part of the Bundesbank's mandate. This arrangement was unique to Germany. The establishment of the European Central Bank with a capacity of its own for liquidity provision made the LiKo-Bank practically redundant.

During the bank's existence, only nine applications for liquidity support were submitted, of which only four were approved, the last in 1985.

On 4 April 2014, the LiKo-Bank's shareholders unanimously approved to start a liquidation process on 31 July 2014. That process was substantially completed in December 2015 as shareholders were reimbursed of their residual interest in the LiKo-Bank's capital, including €38 million for the Bundesbank.

== See also ==
- SoFFin
