= Depfa Bank =

DEPFA Bank plc
- Company type: Private (subsidiary of Hypo Real Estate)
- Industry: banking
- Founded: Dublin (2002)
- Founder: Gerhard Bruckermann
- Headquarters: Dublin, Ireland
- Operating income: €874 million (2006)
- Website: www.depfa.com

DEPFA Bank plc was until its acquisition by Austrian lender Bawag Group in 2022 a Dublin-based bank with a long-standing heritage in public sector financing. It provided financial services to the public sector and also provided financing for larger infrastructure projects. The name derivates from Deutsche Pfandbriefbank.

== History ==
DEPFA Bank was established in 1922 under auspices of the Prussian government, and was asked to provide financing for residential construction projects. Its more recent history began in the 1950s, when the bank become a federally owned corporation, and was to provide for a wide range of residential mortgages. When the corporation lost its tax-free status in the 1970s, it entered the commercial lending industry, becoming the largest German underwriter of public covered bonds. The bank was privatized in 1990, and obtained a FSE listing in 1991.

At the end of the 1990s, the bank went through a legal restructuring, which led the bank to move its headquarters to the IFSC in Dublin, Ireland in 2002 with the Irish government specifically legislating for it. Depfa Bank was purchased by German mortgage giant Hypo Real Estate in October 2007. The bank ran into liquidity problems in 2008 as a result of the economic and financial turmoil in the United States. At the same time, banking supervision in Ireland was very weak, soon to be proved by the 2008–2010 Irish banking crisis.

DEPFA underwrote a group of municipal bonds in the U.S. that subsequently had their ratings downgraded. Under the terms of the underwriting, DEPFA was required to buy back the securities after the downgrade in the ratings. Because of the difficulties in obtaining short-term funding in the markets at that time, Depfa's liquidity became a major concern. Through a series of bailouts, the German government ended up with 100% ownership of Depfa's parent company, Hypo Real Estate.

== See also ==
- List of banks in Germany
- List of banks in the Republic of Ireland
