= Financial institution =

Institution that provides financial services for its clients or members

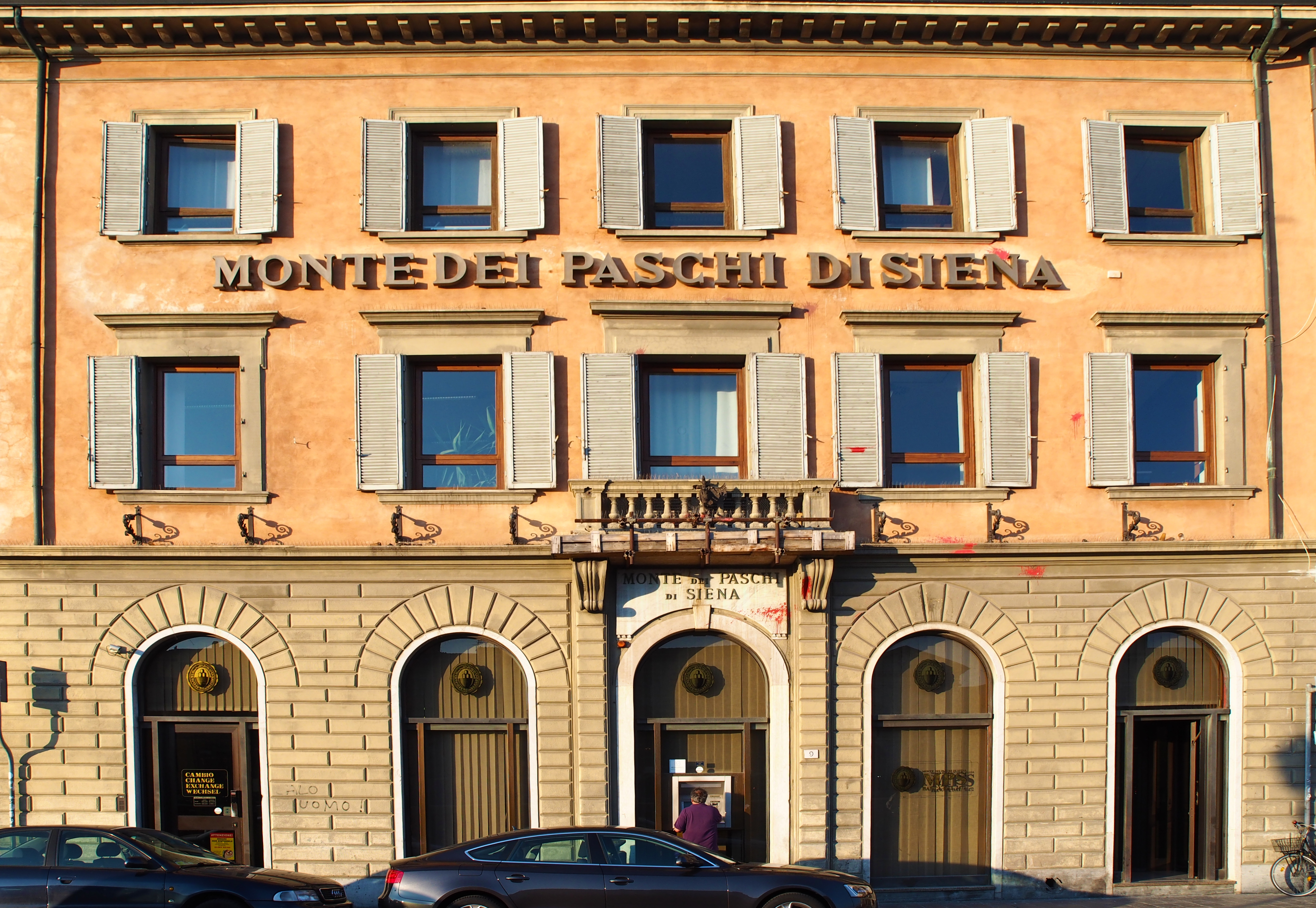
The oldest financial institution in the world, Banca Monte dei Paschi di Siena, founded in 1472.

A financial institution, sometimes called a banking institution, is a business entity that provides service as an intermediary for different types of financial monetary transactions.

== Types ==
Broadly speaking, there are three major types of financial institution:

1. Depository institution – deposit-taking institution that accepts and manages deposits and makes loans, including bank, building society, credit union, trust company, and mortgage broker;
2. Contractual institution – insurance company and pension fund
3. Investment institution – investment bank, underwriter, and other different types of financial entities managing investments.

Financial institutions can be distinguished broadly into two categories according to ownership structure:

- commercial bank
- cooperative bank

Some experts see a trend toward homogenisation of financial institutions, meaning a tendency to invest in similar areas and have similar business strategies. A consequence of this might be fewer banks serving specific target groups, and small-scale producers may be under-served. This is why a target of the United Nations Sustainable Development Goal 10 is to improve the regulation and monitoring of global financial institutions and strengthen such regulations.

== Standard settlement instructions ==
Standard Settlement Instructions (SSIs) are the agreements between two financial institutions which fix the receiving agents of each counterparty in ordinary trades of some type. These agreements allow the related counterparties to make faster operations since the time used to settle the receiving agents is conserved. Limiting each subject to an SSI also lowers the likelihood of a fraud. SSIs are used by financial institutions to facilitate fast and accurate cross-border payments.

== Regulation ==
Financial institutions in most countries operate in a heavily regulated environment because they are critical parts of countries' economies, due to economies' dependence on them to grow the money supply via fractional-reserve banking. A lesson of the 2007–2008 financial crisis was that pre-crisis capital requirements had not accounted for the systemic impact of stress at individual institutions, prompting calls for closer supervision of large, interconnected financial firms. Regulatory structures differ in each country, but typically involve prudential regulation as well as consumer protection and market stability. Some countries have one consolidated agency that regulates all financial institutions while others have separate agencies for different types of institutions such as banks, insurance companies and brokers.

Countries that have separate agencies include the United States, where the key governing bodies are the Federal Financial Institutions Examination Council (FFIEC), Office of the Comptroller of the Currency – National Banks, Federal Deposit Insurance Corporation (FDIC) State "non-member" banks, National Credit Union Administration (NCUA) – Credit Unions, Federal Reserve (Fed) – "member" banks, Office of Thrift Supervision – National Savings & Loan Association, State governments each often regulate and charter financial institutions.

Countries that have one consolidated financial regulator include: Norway with the Financial Supervisory Authority of Norway, Germany with Federal Financial Supervisory Authority and Russia with Central Bank of Russia.

== Merits ==
Merits of raising funds through financial institutions are as follows:

1. Financial institutions provide long term finance, which are not provided by commercial banks;
2. The funds are made available even during periods of depression, when other sources of finance are not available;
3. Obtaining loan from financial institutions increases the goodwill of the borrowing in the capital market. Consequently, such a company can raise funds easily from other sources as well;
4. Besides providing funds, many of these institutions provide financial, managerial and technical advice and consultancy to business firms;
5. As repayment of loan can be made in easy installments, it does not prove to be much of burden on the business.

== See also ==
- Ethical banking
- Financial economics
- International financial institutions
- List of financial supervisory authorities by country
- Non-bank financial institution
- Savings and loan association
- Society for Worldwide Interbank Financial Telecommunication
