= Deutsche Hypothekenbank =

Coordinates: 52°22′11.14″N 9°44′30.91″E

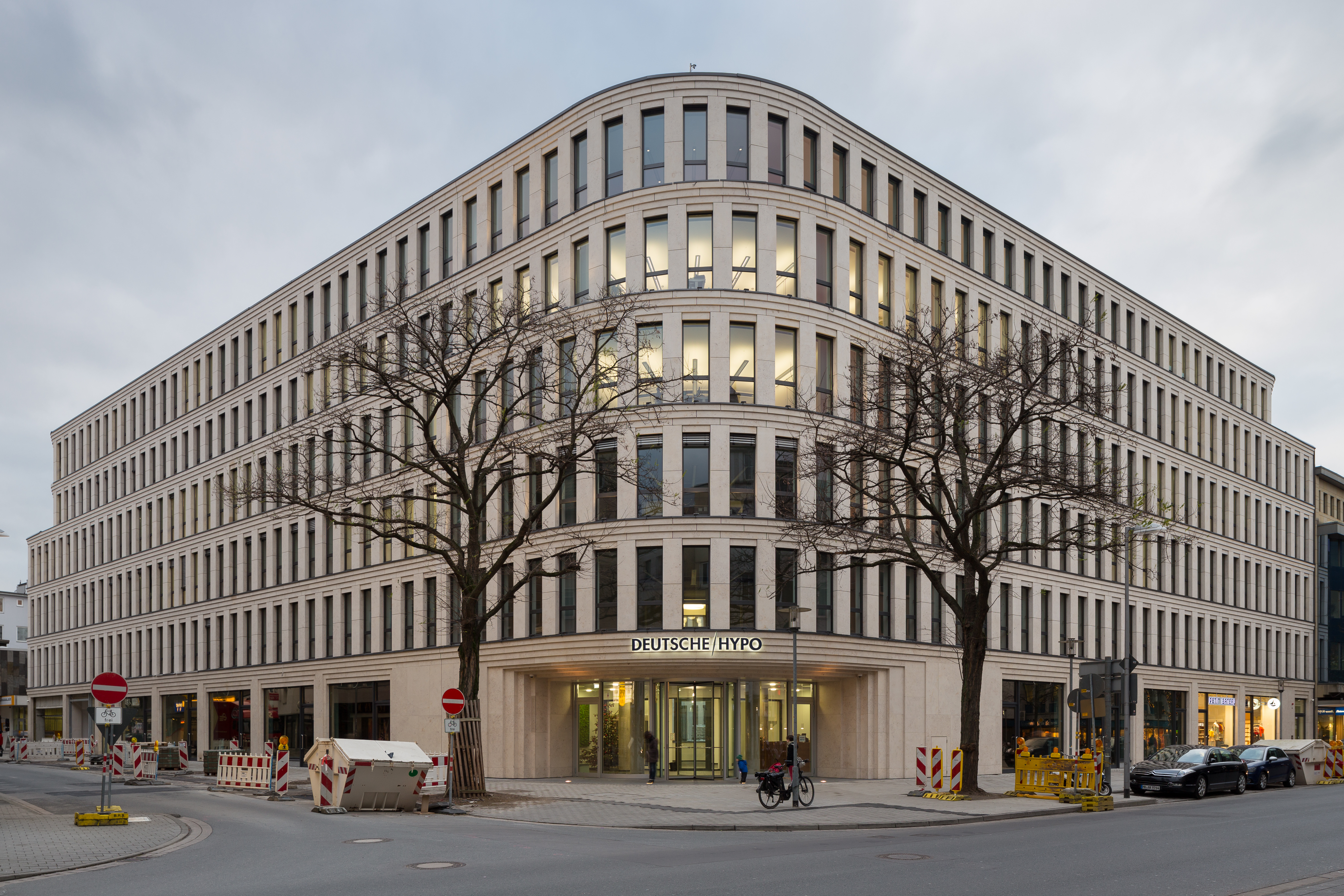
- Headquarters in Osterstraße 31 in Hanover
- Company type: Corporation
- Industry: Mortgage bank
- Founded: 13 February 1872
- Headquarters: Hanover, Germany
- Total assets: €21.1 billion (2018)
- Number of employees: 430 (2018)
- Parent: NORD/LB
- Website: www.deutsche-hypo.de

The Deutsche Hypothekenbank (Actien-Gesellschaft) is a German mortgage bank based in Hanover, which specializes in the financing of commercial real estate and the capital market business with domestic and foreign clients. It is a company of NORD/LB and forms the center of excellence for the core business area Commercial Real Estate Financing. The bank employs around 400 people at its five domestic locations in Hanover, Berlin, Frankfurt, Hamburg and Munich as well as its foreign locations in Amsterdam, London, Paris, Madrid and Warsaw. With a balance sheet total of almost €23.7 billion, the Deutsche Hypo is one of Germany's largest real estate financiers.

== History ==
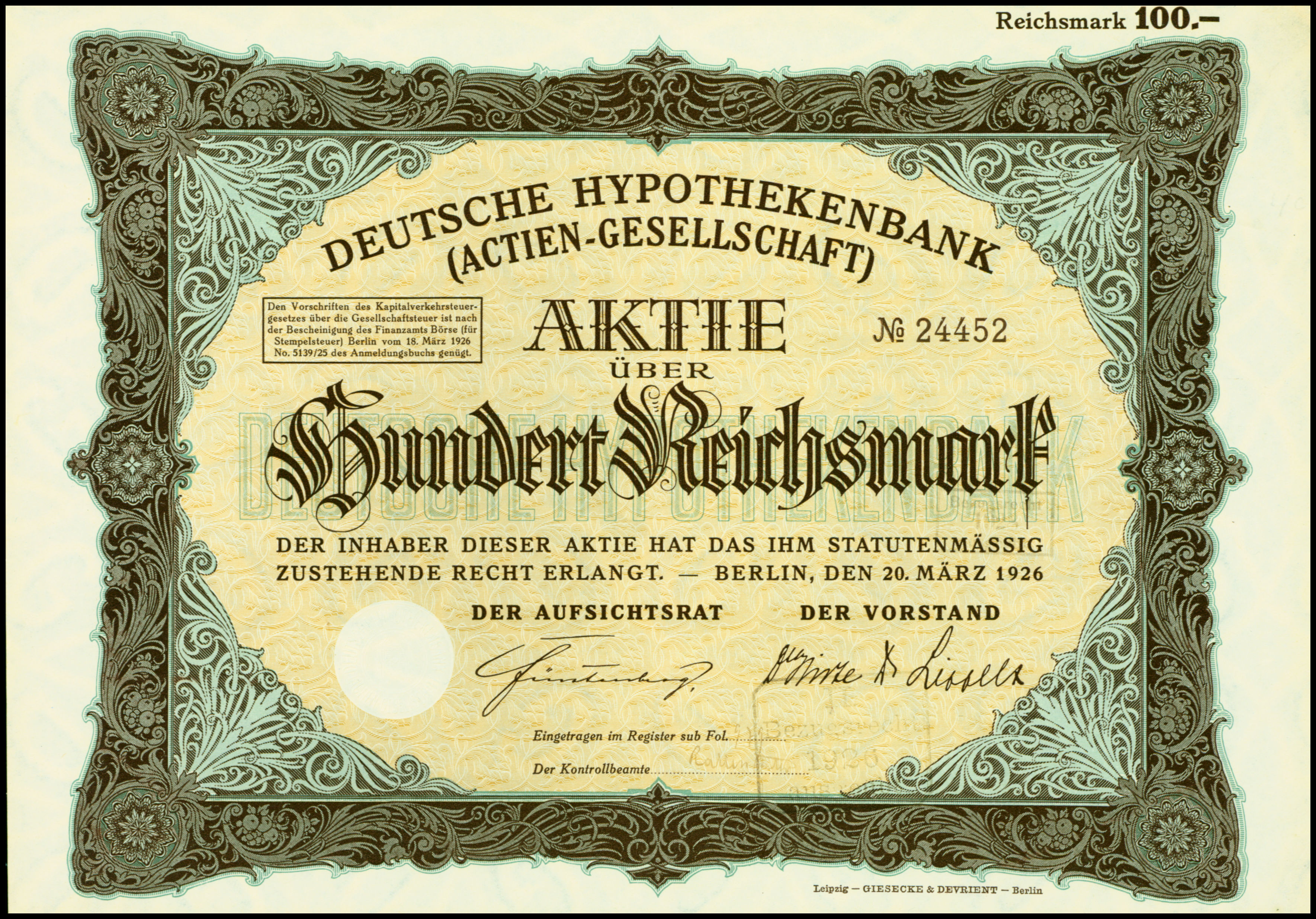
Share over 100 RM of the Deutsche Hypothekenbank (AG) of March 20, 1926

Founded in 1872 by Berlin merchants, the Deutsche Hypo is one of the oldest German mortgage lenders. It specializes in advising and financing real estate projects predominantly in Germany, Great Britain, France, Benelux and Poland. Furthermore, the Deutsche Hypo is active in the public sector lending business.

In 1999, ING Group acquired majority control of Deutsche Hypothekenbank through its purchase of BHF Bank. It sold its 83.7 percent stake in 2006 to BHF Bank (by then owned by Sal. Oppenheim) and M. M. Warburg & Co. as well as private investors Peter Döhle Schiffahrts-KG and Josef H. Boquoi Familienstiftung.

== Business ==
The Deutsche Hypo specializes in large-volume financing with professional real estate clients. In addition to its activities in Germany, the Deutsche Hypo operates in the European target countries Great Britain, France, Benelux and Poland. Another pillar of its business activities is the capital market business with domestic and foreign market participants. The refinancing takes place via bonds. Both the Deutsche Hypo's mortgage and public sector bonds are rated "Baa2" (lower medium grade) by Moody's rating agency.

== Key figures ==
| Reference number | 2015 | 2016 | 2017 | 2018 |
|---|---|---|---|---|
| New real estate business (EUR million) | 4.075,2 | 4.540,7 | 3.798,3 | 2.869,8 |
| Real estate loans (million EUR) | 11.953,6 | 11.977,0 | 12.077,1 | 12.264,0 |
| Refinancing funds (EUR million) | 25.243,7 | 23.493,4 | 22.254,0 | 19.616,7 |
| Earnings before taxes and profit transfer (EUR million) | 61,8 | 104,9 | 59,9 | 58,2 |
| Cost-income ratio | 35,6 % | 37,8 % | 42,3 % | 49,5 % |
