= Samurai Shokai =

Former art and antique shop in Yokohama

Samurai Shokai company
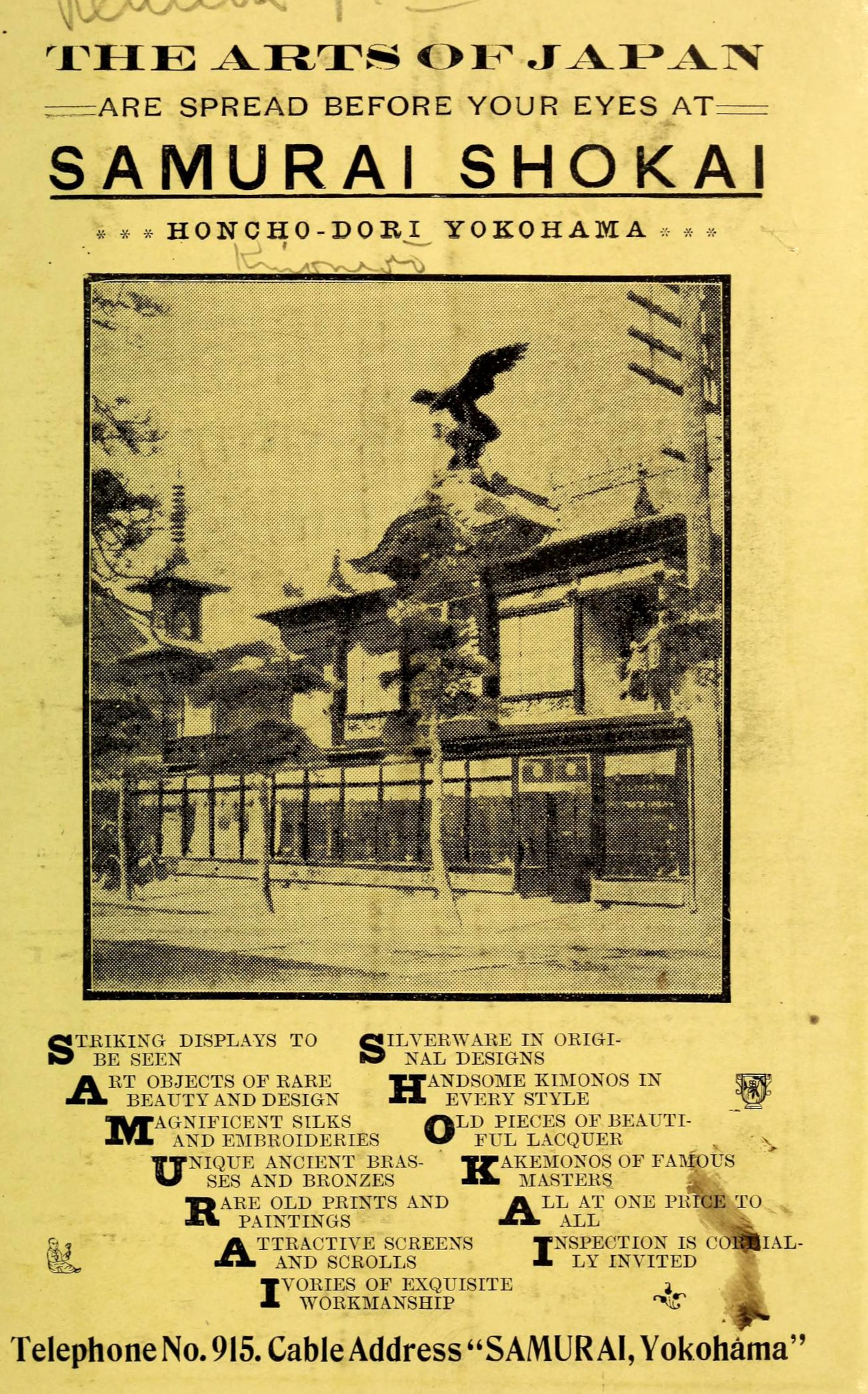
- Advert for the Samurai Shokai company in a 1913 guidebook
- Company type: Art dealer
- Founded: 1894
- Founder: Nomura Yozo
- Headquarters: Yokohama, Japan
- Area served: International

The Samurai Shokai company (Japanese: サムライ商会), also written Samurai Shokwai, was an art and antique shop based in Yokohama, Japan which developed an international reputation. Founded in 1894, it was completely destroyed in the 1923 Great Kantō earthquake but was rebuilt and continued to operate until 1965. As well as having a distinctive shop, the company sold by mail order. Some art works created or sold by the company remain in present-day art collections.

== History and location ==
The shop was founded in late 1894 by Nomura Yozo (Note: In this Japanese name, the surname is Nomura.) who had visited the United States as a translator. On these travels, he encountered the political scientist Nitobe Inazō. Nitobe aimed to be a "bridge spanning the Pacific", educating foreigners about Japanese art and culture, and inspired Nomura to take on this goal. Nomura chose "Samurai" for the shop's name as a Japanese word that foreigners would recognise and because of its connection to the Bushido ("way of the warrior") moral code that he wanted to promote.

Nomura started with no financial backing and no prior experience as a trader. He took out a loan of 175 yen and rented a building in central Yokohama, using some of the money to fix it up and adapt it. The additions included a tower resembling that of a castle. The shop's entrance displayed coats of arms, armour, and other distinctively Japanese objects. Having no money to purchase stock, Nomura persuaded his contacts to share objects on consignment. In the first several months, very little was sold, but foreign collectors and Japanese dignitaries started to make large purchases and the business grew in revenue and reputation.

The shop contained lacquerware, metalwork, porcelains, wood carvings and other art objects. It so resembled an art museum that the building had the nickname "The Fine Art Museum of Yokohama". A sign in front of the shop called it "the King of Curios".

Whereas other dealers saw foreigners as uninformed customers who could be sold inferior goods, Nomura sought to educate them about Japanese art and win their confidence. By 1900, the shop had developed an international reputation and introduced a mail order service. In 1912, it was reported as doing a million yen of business each year and was one of the most popular locations in the city for American tourists, partly due to its eye-catching central location.

The 1923 Great Kantō earthquake destroyed most of the city of Yokohama, including the shop and many of its art objects but, after a difficult few years, the owners rebuilt the shop and traded much as they had before.

== Connected people ==
I hate seeing American soldiers chasing after Japanese women. If you are going to stay in Japan, please study Japanese art.

— Nomura Yozo

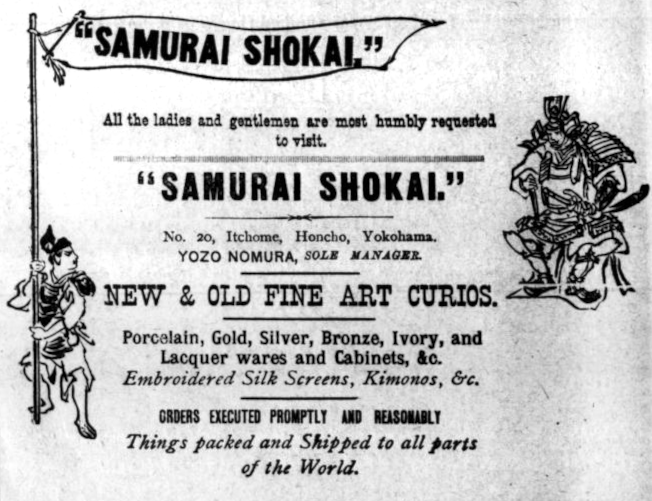
Printed advert for the shop, 1898

Nomura Yozo (Japanese: 野村洋三) was the founder and president of the company. Born in 1869 in Gifu Prefecture, he excelled as a student of English and took three trips to the United States as a translator. There he made useful contacts and learned foreign customs including shaking hands, which he practiced for the rest of his life and promoted in a book of essays. In the Panama–Pacific International Exhibition of 1915, he exhibited mantel ornaments made of forged copper. His success as a businessman led to the position of Director of the Yokohama Chamber of Commerce & Industry. In this capacity, he represented the Japanese merchandising sector at a trade convention in Honolulu in 1932. He also founded Japan's Society for the Prevention of Cruelty to Animals. From 1938 onwards, he was also the proprietor of the Hotel New Grand and greeted guests personally until he was too unwell to do so. He died on 20 March 1965 at the age of 95.

Nomura Michi was the wife of Nomura Yozo; they married in 1898. Customers at the shop described her as very charming and with a good command of English. An account published in 1932 said "'Samurai Shokai' without Mrs. Nomura is like a flower without color or fragrance." From 1906 to 1908, she made trips to China, Europe, and the United States, acquiring cultural influences that complemented her husband's. Aside from the shop, she led, or was active in, many organisations including the Yokohama branch of the YWCA, of which she was president.

Nomura Mitsumasa was Nomura Yozo's son-in-law and became the manager of the Samurai Shokai company, adopting his father-in-law's family name.

Iwata Shigeho, a silk dealer in Yokohama, taught Nomura Yozo about the art trade and gave practical help in the creation of the company.

The American railroad magnate and art collector Charles Lang Freer, who later established the Freer Gallery of Art in Washington D.C., befriended Nomura Yozo in 1895 and hired him as a guide. A number of works now in the gallery were bought from the Samurai Shokai company.

== Art works ==
The company produced silverware, marked with the English words "Samurai Shokai Yokohama Sterling".

Two lacquer cabinets produced by the company are now in the Khalili Collection of Japanese art. One, sold in 1909, shows fourteen scenes from Japanese history, featuring Samurai warriors including Nitta Yoshisada, Honda Tadakatsu, and Toyotomi Hideyoshi. It stands 227 centimetres (89 in) tall and includes silvered and gilded fittings as well as four kinds of lacquer.

The other cabinet, with inventory number LX037, was, according to an included letter, created for the Japan–British Exhibition of 1910 but not finished in time to be included. It is 156 centimetres (61 in) tall and includes lacquered landscape scenes and silver fittings.

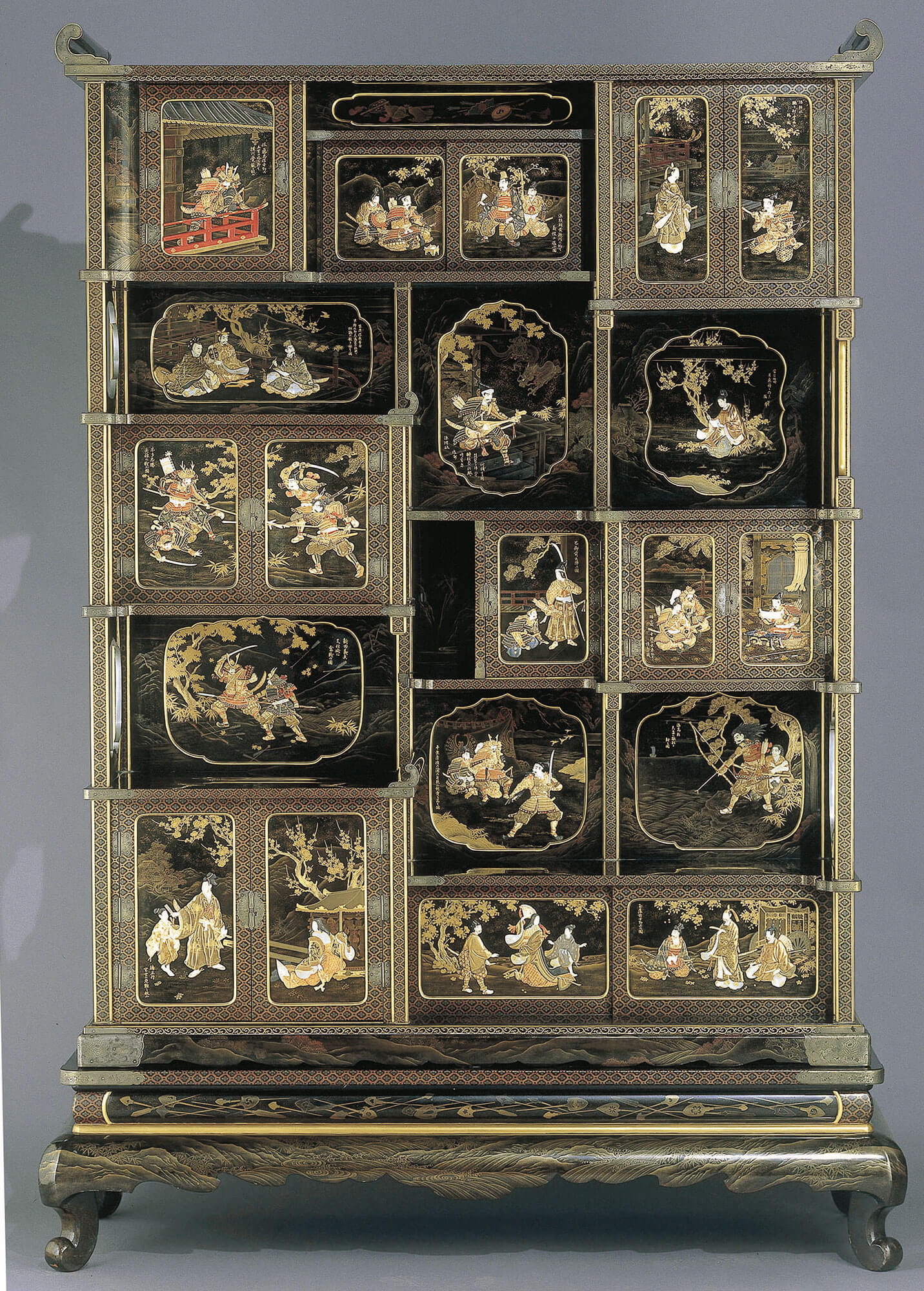
Lacquer cabinet with fourteen scenes of Japanese history, Khalili Collection of Japanese Art

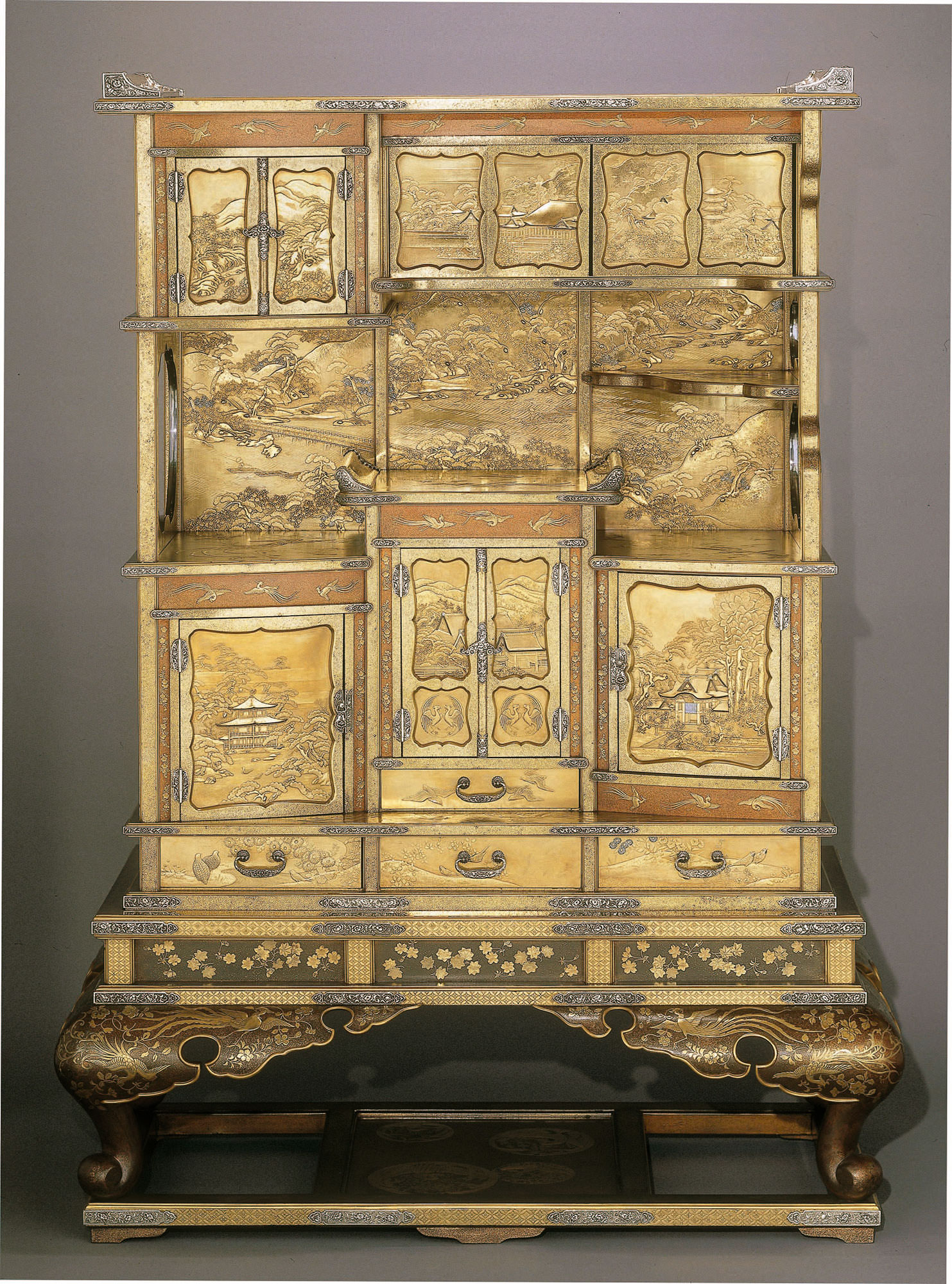
Lacquer cabinet with landscape scenes, Khalili Collection of Japanese Art

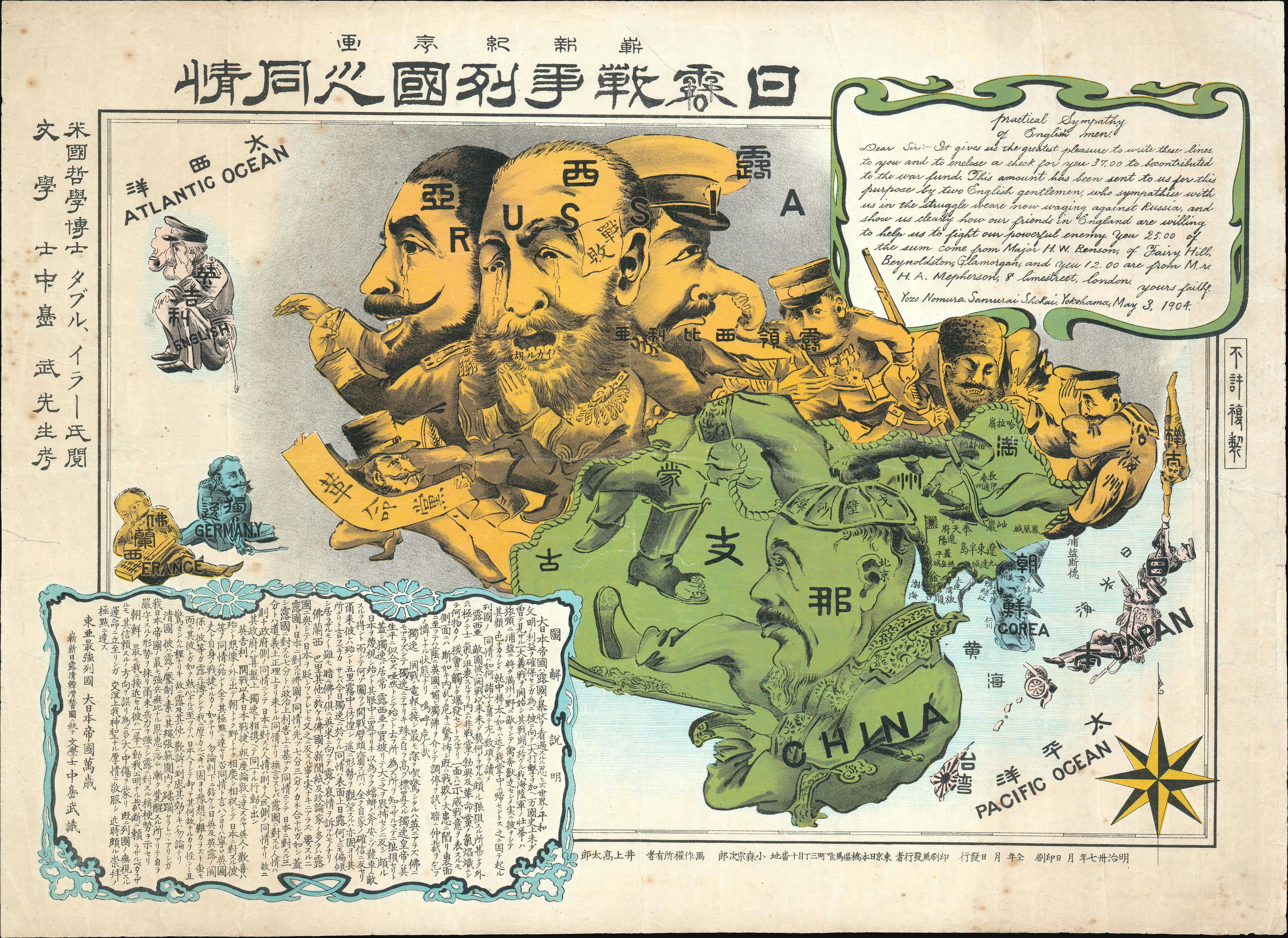
Map humorously illustrating allegiances in the Russo-Japanese War, with message in English (top right) by Nomura Yozo, 1904

== Recognition ==
Samurai Shokai submitted a set of metalwork pieces to the Japan–British Exhibition of 1910, winning a gold prize.

A guide book published in 1928 described Samurai Shokai as the best shop in Yokohama for antique art and curios. It "unreservedly recommended" Nomura Yozo for "whosoever is interested in the real fine arts of Japan."
