= ISO 20022 =

Standard for electronic data interchange between financial institutions

ISO 20022 is an ISO standard for electronic data interchange between financial institutions. It describes a metadata repository containing descriptions of messages and business processes, and a maintenance process for the repository content. The standard covers financial information transferred between financial institutions that includes payment transactions, securities trading and settlement information, credit and debit card transactions and other financial information. Initial adoption began in March 2023 with a transition roadmap published by SWIFT.

The message metadata is described by UML models with a special ISO 20022 UML Profile. Underlying all of this is the ISO 20022 metamodel – a model of the models. The UML profile is the metamodel transformed into UML. The metadata is transformed into the syntax of messages used in financial networks. The first syntax supported for messages was XML Schema.

ISO 20022 is widely used in financial services. ISO 20022 is the successor to ISO 15022; originally ISO 20022 was called ISO 15022 2nd Edition. ISO 15022 was the successor of ISO 7775.

== Parts of the standard ==
ISO 20022 Financial services – Universal financial industry message scheme.

| Part | Part Name |
|---|---|
| ISO 20022-1:2026 | Metamodel |
| ISO 20022-2:2013 | UML profile |
| ISO 20022-3:2026 | Modeling |
| ISO 20022-4:2026 | XML Schema generation |
| ISO 20022-5:2026 | Conceptual interoperability and reverse engineering |
| ISO 20022-6:2013 | Message transport characteristics |
| ISO 20022-7:2026 | Registration |
| ISO 20022-8:2026 | ASN.1 generation |
| ISO 20022-9:2026 | Syntax generation requirements and rules |

== Management of the standard ==
- The Standard is issued by ISO Technical Committee 68 (TC68), which is responsible for Financial Services in ISO.
- The Standard is managed by Sub Committee 9 (SC 9) "Information exchange for financial services".
- The Working Group 4 (WG4), a sub-group of SC 9, who works on the next revision of ISO 20022.
- The Standard defines a Registration Management Group (RMG) Composed of senior industry experts. It is the highest registration body.
- SEG Standard Evolution Group composed of industry experts in specific business domains of the financial industry
- SWIFT is the Registration Authority (RA) for ISO 20022. RA is the guardian of the ISO 20022 financial repository. The AG 1 Group oversees the performance of RA.

== Adoption ==
A 2015 report by the United States's Federal Reserve System classified Europe having "mature adopters" of ISO 20022; India, South Africa, Japan, Singapore, and Switzerland as having "growing adopters"; and Australia, Canada, the United Kingdom, and New Zealand as having "interested adopters". The report concluded that the Federal Reserve should push for ISO 20022 adoption within the United States financial system.

Australia's New Payments Platform, launched in February 2018, uses ISO 20022 messaging.

The Reserve Bank of New Zealand plans to support ISO 20022 from November 2022 onward.

Nordic countries launched the P27 payment platform, but that initiative eventually failed in 2023.

The Eurosystem in March 2023 switched its real-time gross settlement to T2, which follows ISO 20022. The switch involves transactions for settling payments related to the Eurosystem's monetary policy operations, as well as bank‑to‑bank and commercial transactions. TARGET2 previously handled transactions for over 2000 G€ per day.

In the United States, the Federal Reserve's Fedwire Funds Service will begin using the ISO 20022 messaging format in July 2025. The Federal Reserve's FedNow instant payments service also uses ISO 20022 messaging. The private Clearing House Payments Company's RTP instant payments service uses ISO 20022 messaging. Its CHIPS funds transfer service migrated to using ISO 20022 in April 2024.

== See also ==
- ISO 4217 – Standard defining codes for currencies
- ISO 10962 – Standard for financial instrument codes
- ISO 8583 – International standard for financial transaction card originated interchange messaging
- Society for Worldwide Interbank Financial Telecommunication – Financial telecommunication network
