= Hypo Real Estate =

- Company type: Government-owned corporation
- Industry: Financial services
- Founded: 2003; 23 years ago
- Headquarters: Munich, Germany
- Key people: Manuela Better (acting CEO), Bernd Thiemann (Chairman of the supervisory board)
- Products: Commercial property financing, infrastructure and public finance, capital markets and asset management
- Net income: ▲€257 million (2011)
- Total assets: €236.6 billion (2011)
- Owner: SoFFin
- Number of employees: 1,419 (2011)
- Website: www.hyporealestate.com

The Hypo Real Estate Holding AG is a holding company based in Munich, Germany which comprises many real estate financing banks. The company's activities span three sectors of the real estate market: commercial property, infrastructure and public finance, and capital markets and asset management. Hypo Real Estate is the second largest commercial property lender in Germany.

The bank originated in 2003 from the real estate financing business of HypoVereinsbank. It employs about 2,000 people and was one of the 30 members of the DAX stock market index of the largest German companies between December 2005 and December 2008, before the shares were demoted to the MDAX. Its shares were further demoted to the SDAX in September 2009. In 2007 it acquired the public finance company Depfa Bank. The company remains a legal entity as a wholly owned subsidiary of the Hypo Real Estate Group.

The firm received a bailout from the Deutsche Bundesbank and other German banks in October 2008 during the 2008 financial crisis, before approving a complete nationalization a year later.

== Financial difficulties ==
=== Crisis summits ===
Hypo Real Estate encountered financial difficulties during the 2008 financial crisis, principally due to the heavy debt burden of its Depfa Bank subsidiary. On 29 September 2008, Finance Minister of Germany Peer Steinbrück announced that a €35 billion line of credit would be extended to Hypo Real Estate from the Government of Germany and a consortium of German banks.

After the first crisis summit, the supervisory board members independent from and unaffiliated to JC Flowers and Grove International Partners LLP resigned from the office. As successors, Michael Endres (chairman), Bernd Knobloch, Edgar Meister, Sigmar Mosdorf, Hans Jörg Vetter, Bernhard Walter and Manfred Zaß were appointed to the board.

The deal fell apart on 4 October 2008 after the banking consortium involved pulled out. A second proposed bailout was agreed on 6 October, with German banks to contribute €30 billion and the Deutsche Bundesbank €20 billion to a credit line.

After the second crisis, summit some politicians demanded that HRE's top management resign, among them Federal Minister of Finance Peer Steinbrück who stated that he had been kept in the dark and that it was "unthinkable" to keep dealing with them, especially after they had used lawyers against the government to attempt to evade responsibilities. CEO Georg Funke subsequently stepped down, replaced by Axel Wieandt on 31 October 2008.

=== Further guarantees ===
Via several steps, Hypo Real Estate was granted further framework guarantees by the German Financial Markets Stabilisation Fund (SoFFin) in February 2009, taking its total state funding to €52 billion.

=== SoFFin takeover offer ===
On 17 April 2009, SoFFin tendered an offer to take over Hypo Real Estate by buying and creating shares that would raise its equity stake to 90%. On 24 April 2009 the HRE governing boards recommended that shareholders approve the offer by the rescue agency. By that date, government support for the company had reached €102 billion. Under a law passed in March, the government could force the sale if shareholders reject it.

Meanwhile, the German parliament formed a committee to investigate the HRE bailout. Opposition parties from the left and right spurred creation of the committee, while the governing centrist coalition abstained.

=== Nationalisation ===
With the German state (via SoFFin) already owning 90% of HRE, an extraordinary general meeting on 5 October 2009 approved a €1.30 per share squeeze out of the remaining private shareholders, including J.C. Flowers (which a year earlier had taken a 25% stake at €22.50 per share). The decision resulted in the complete nationalization of the firm within a year of it having been a DAX constituent.

== Subsidiaries ==
- Hypo Real Estate Bank International
- Hypo Real Estate Bank
- Hypo Public Finance Bank
- Hypo Pfandbrief Bank International
- Depfa Bank
- DEPFA Deutsche Pfandbriefbank

== See also ==
- List of banks in Germany
