= SoFFin =

Socio-economic program in Germany

SoFFin logo

The SoFFin (Sonderfonds Finanzmarktstabilisierung - Special Financial Market Stabilization Funds) is a program of the German government with the purpose to stabilize and restore confidence in the financial system. It was created during the 2008 financial crisis on October 17, 2008 by the German Parliament and enacted on October 20, 2008. As of December 31, 2010, it stopped offering new services but continued managing existing guarantees.

In November 2011, it was announced that it would be revived for potential new issues if necessary.

Initially it was established as an agency of the Deutsche Bundesbank and was supervised by the federal ministry of finance. The fund was managed by Dr. Hannes Rehm (speaker), Dr. Christopher Pleister and Gerhard Strattthaus.

Operations were conducted through three tasks:

- Providing Liquidity by means of guarantees for specially issued debt by eligible financial institutions
- Investing in Equity (recapitalization)
- Purchasing securities in open market operations

The SoFFin may grant guarantees of up to 400bn euros and recapitalize or purchase assets for an additional 80bn euros.

In January 2011 the SoFFin was reorganized under the then created German Agency for the Stabilization of the Financial Markets. Since the end of 2015, it has no longer been possible to apply for aid measures from it. Instead, the FMS manages the holdings that have existed since then and is endeavoring to reduce them. In its stabilization function, the FMS was replaced by the new Single Resolution Fund of the European bank resolution mechanism. At the beginning of 2018, the Financial Market Stabilization Fund was integrated into the Federal Republic of Germany - Finance Agency GmbH.

== SoFFin guaranteed issues ==
Issuer	Issue date	ISIN	Amount Issued [€]	Coupon	Maturity
HYPO REAL ESTATE	11/13/2008	DE000A0XXY00	15,000,000,000	0.726	12/23/2009
COMMERZBANK AG	1/15/2009	DE000CB896A7	5,000,000,000	2.75	1/13/2012
HSH NORDBANK AG	1/20/2009	DE000HSH2539	3,000,000,000	2.75	1/20/2012
BAYERISCHE LNDBK	1/23/2009	DE000BLB5N07	5,000,000,000	2.75	1/23/2012
IKB DEUT INDUSTR	1/28/2009	DE000A0SMN03	2,000,000,000	2.875	1/27/2012
SDB-SICHERUNGS	2/5/2009	DE000A0AD7F4	447,000,000	1.02	2/3/2012
SDB-SICHERUNGS	2/5/2009	DE000A0AD7G2	223,000,000	1.02	2/3/2012
DUESSELDORF HYP	3/13/2009	DE000DUS1S07	125,000,000	0.978	3/12/2010
DUESSELDORF HYP	3/13/2009	DE000DUS2S06	125,000,000	1.031	3/11/2011
IKB DEUT INDUSTR	3/13/2009	DE000A0SMN45	2,000,000,000	2.625	3/13/2012
AAREAL BANK AG	3/26/2009	DE000AAR0041	2,000,000,000	2.625	3/26/2012
IKB DEUT INDUSTR	4/30/2009	DE000A0SMN52	1,000,000,000	2.25	4/29/2011
HSH NORDBANK AG	5/11/2009	DE000HSH27X2	3,000,000,000	2	5/11/2011
HYPO REAL ESTATE	5/14/2009	DE000A0XFP11	5,000,000	0.683	5/15/2011
COREALCREDIT	6/2/2009	DE000A0BVBN3	1,000,000	1.225	6/1/2011
HYPO REAL ESTATE	6/3/2009	DE000A0XFP29	5,000,000	1.124	6/4/2012
HYPO REAL ESTATE	6/12/2009	DE000A0Z1J14	5,000,000,000	3.772	6/12/2014
COREALCREDIT	7/13/2009	DE000A0BVBQ6	1,000,000	2.02	7/13/2011
HSH NORDBANK AG	7/23/2009	DE000HSH29Z3	3,000,000,000	2.25	7/23/2012
IKB DEUT INDUSTR	9/10/2009	DE000A0SMN60	2,000,000,000	2.125	9/10/2012
COREALCREDIT	10/16/2009	DE000A0BVBW4	15,000,000	0.823	10/4/2011
COREALCREDIT	11/2/2009	DE000A0BVBX2	15,000,000	0.872	11/2/2011
DT PFANDBRIEFBAN	11/11/2009	DE000A1A6PM3	5,000,000,000	0.768	6/30/2010
DT PFANDBRIEFBAN	11/11/2009	DE000A1A6PL5	5,000,000,000	0.768	6/30/2010
DT PFANDBRIEFBAN	11/11/2009	DE000A1A6PN1	5,000,000,000	0.768	6/30/2010

== SoFFin Equity recapitalizations ==
Institution	contracted amount [€]
Aareal Bank AG	380,000,000
Commerzbank AG	18,200,000,000
Hypo Real Estate Holding AG	7,700,000,000
WestLB AG	3,000,000,000

== See also ==
- Liquidity Consortium Bank
