= BRICS Pay =

Distributed payment messaging mechanism system

BRICS PAY
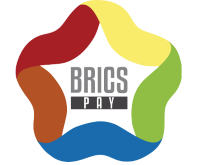
- Industry: Telecommunications
- Products: Financial telecommunication
- Website: brics-pay.com

BRICS Pay (stylized as BRICS PAY) is a decentralized and independent payment messaging mechanism system that is affiliated with the BRICS organization.

== System ==
The project is a joint venture developed by the BRICS member states to receive and make payments in their own local currencies. The venture was launched in 2018 by the BRICS Business Council. The team that cooperatively runs BRICS PAY consists of financial, banking technology experts from the four founding nations of BRICS, as well as South Africa. The purpose of BRICS PAY is to make international payments more safe, transparent, less costly and complicated, encouraging international cooperation between the quickly expanding BRICS members.

On October 23, 2024, China fully backed BRICS PAY.

=== BRICS DCMS ===
BRICS PAY will feature a decentralized Cross-border messaging system (DCMS), developed by scientists of the Center of Saint-Petersburg State University of Russia. DCMS operates transparently, without any central owner or hub. Participants manage their own nodes, allegedly making the system resistant to external abuse, control, or interference. The system does not feature mandatory transaction fees, but allows participants to optionally charge one another if they choose to. DCMS automatically builds transaction routes between participants, aiming to ensure reliable communication even in cases where direct transmission is unavailable. The goal is to minimize settlement imbalances between counterparties. Messages will be encrypted and signed, with multiple encryption mechanisms available. Participants can establish currency conversion rates and transaction limits. With recommended settings, DCMS claims to reach 20,000 messages per second, while on the other hand imposing minimal hardware requirements. DCMS is also planned to be open source, after passing the piloting phase.

The member states view BRICS Pay to promote trade among its members, financial inclusion, and as a direction to reduce their reliance on the US dollar. Russia has been the strongest proponent of BRICS Pay, to bypass the SWIFT network and the US dollar transactions, but it was sanctioned from following its invasion of Ukraine. Iran, also under US sanctions, sees this as a top national priority. Brazil's president Lula da Silva also supported the mechanism, stating that "the multipolar order we aim for is reflected in the international financial system" and suggested a BRICS currency.

Kazan Declaration of October 2024 recognised the benefits of cross-border payment instruments to minimise "trade barriers and non-discriminatory access" and the use of local currencies in financial transactions between BRICS countries and their trading partners", without commitments to a unified currency.

== See also ==
- mBridge
- Bilateral key exchange and the new Relationship Management Application (RMA)
- Cross-Border Interbank Payment System (CIPS)
- Dedollarisation
- Electronic money
- Indian Financial System Code (IFSC)
- Single Euro Payments Area (SEPA)
- Sibos conference
- SWIFT
- TIPANET
- Value transfer system
