= Structured Financial Messaging System =

Indian equivalent of the SWIFT financial transfer system

SFMS
- Company type: Payment system
- Founded: 2001; 25 years ago
- Headquarters: Hyderabad, Telangana, India
- Parent: Reserve Bank of India
- Website: iftas.in/sfms/

Structured Financial Messaging System (SFMS) is a secure messaging standard developed to serve as a platform for intra-bank and inter-bank applications. It is an Indian standard similar to SWIFT which is the international messaging system used for financial messaging globally.

SFMS can be used for secure communication within and between banks. The SFMS was launched on 14 December 2001 at IDRBT. It allows the definition of message structures, message formats, and authorization of the same for usage by the financial community. SFMS has a number of features and it is a modularised and web enabled software, with a flexible architecture facilitating centralised or distributed deployment. The access control is through smart card-based user access and messages are secured by means of standard encryption and authentication services conforming to ISO standards.

The intra-bank part of SFMS is used by banks to take full advantage of the secure messaging facility it provides. The inter-bank messaging part is used by applications like electronic funds transfer (EFT), real time gross settlement systems (RTGS), delivery versus payments (DVP), centralised funds management systems (CFMS) and others. The SFMS provides application program interfaces (APIs), which can be used to integrate existing and future applications with the SFMS. Several banks have integrated it with their core or centralised banking software.

== The Indian Financial Technology and Allied Services (IFTAS) ==
With a view to provide focused attention and enable development of techno-banking in the country, the institute has promoted a new Section 8 company named The Indian Financial Technology and Allied Services (IFTAS). Since 1 April 2016, operation of SFMS has been handled by IFTAS, which took over the platform from IDRBT and was wholly acquired by the Reserve Bank of India in 2019. Headquartered in Mumbai, the mandate of the IFTAS is to provide IT-related services to the RBI, banks and other financial institutions.

Services like Indian Financial Network (INFINET), Structured Financial Messaging System (SFMS) and the Indian Banking Community Cloud (IBCC) have been handed over to IFTAS with effect from April 1, 2016.

== See also ==
- Cross-Border Interbank Payment System (CIPS)
- Cryptocurrency / Digital currency
- Digital renminbi
- Digital rupee
- Indian Financial System Code (IFSC)
- SWIFT
- Instrument in Support of Trade Exchanges (INSTEX)
- International sanctions
- Single Euro Payments Area (SEPA)
- SPFS
- Terrorist Finance Tracking Program
- TIPANET
