= Dedollarisation =

Replacing US dollar for other currencies

Dedollarisation refers to efforts by governments, firms and market participants to reduce the use of the U.S. dollar in reserves, trade invoicing and settlement, cross-border finance, and domestic transactions. Motivations are diverse, and include gaining greater economic independence, reducing exposure to U.S. monetary and sanctions policy, lowering currency mismatch and transaction costs, and building local market infrastructure. The channels of dedollarisation are distinct and progress is uneven across them.

Since the establishment of the Bretton Woods system, the US dollar has been used as the medium for international trade. The U.S. dollar remains the leading international currency by most measures: foreign-exchange turnover, trade invoicing outside Europe, and the denomination of cross-border assets. However, its share in official reserves has drifted down gradually over two decades.

== History ==
The U.S. dollar began to displace the pound sterling as the international reserve currency from the 1920s since it emerged from the First World War relatively unscathed and since the United States was a significant recipient of wartime gold inflows. After the U.S. emerged as an even stronger superpower during the Second World War, the Bretton Woods Agreement of 1944 established the post-war international monetary system, with the U.S. dollar ascending to become the world's primary reserve currency for international trade, and the only post-war currency linked to gold at $35 per troy ounce.

Under the Bretton Woods system established after World War II, the value of gold was fixed to $35 per troy ounce, and the value of the U.S. dollar was thus anchored to the value of gold. Rising government spending in the 1960s, however, led to doubts about the ability of the United States to maintain this convertibility, gold stocks dwindled as banks and international investors began to convert dollars to gold, and as a result, the dollar's value began to decline. Facing an emerging currency crisis and the imminent danger that the United States would no longer be able to redeem dollars for gold, gold convertibility was finally terminated in 1971 by President Nixon, resulting in the "Nixon shock".

The value of the U.S. dollar was therefore no longer anchored to gold, and it fell upon the Federal Reserve to maintain the value of the U.S. currency. The Federal Reserve, however, continued to increase the money supply, resulting in stagflation and a rapidly declining value of the U.S. dollar in the 1970s. This was largely due to the prevailing economic view at the time that inflation and real economic growth were linked (the Phillips curve), so inflation was regarded as relatively benign. Between 1965 and 1981, the U.S. dollar lost two thirds of its value.

=== Global reserve currency shares over time ===
The percental composition of currencies of official foreign exchange reserves from 1995 to 2025.

== Causes ==
=== Adverse American foreign policies and tariffs ===
The dollar's stability and safety as a global safe haven is being undermined by increased political polarization jeopardizing governance or by destabilizing economic policies like ongoing (as of 2026) U.S. tariffs, which cause investors to lose confidence in American assets and the country's overall standing. America and its western allies' foreign policies, such as weaponisation of economic sanctions and SWIFT system, has forced other nations to dedollarise to evade international sanctions. In 2025, during the second presidency of Donald Trump, many countries began moving away from the US dollar as a foreign currency reserve. This coincides with the US beginning to pursue an isolationist foreign policy and an erratic economic policy. In particular, during the 2026 Iran war, Harvard economist Kenneth Rogoff criticised Operation Economic Outcast as being likely to accelerate dedollarisation, cause China and Europe to expand their own international financial systems, and make China retaliate against the U.S. with its own leverage in rare earths and pharmaceuticals.

In 2026, Fortune cited EBC Financial Group market analyst Sana Ur Rehman, who argued that France's replacement of its remaining New York-held gold with compliant bars stored in Paris and Canada's creation of the C$25 billion Canada Strong Fund represented a broader phase of dedollarisation involving longstanding U.S. allies rather than primarily geopolitical adversaries. Rehman linked the development in part of tariffs and trade unertainty. Reuters reported that France's operation left the overall size of its golf reserves unchanged and that Banque de France Governor Francois Villeroy de Galhau said the decision was not politically motivated. The Canadian government described the Canada Strong Fund as part of an effort to build a more independent and resilient Canadian economy.

=== Emergence of other nations as power centres ===
The popularity of the dollar is also being undermined by the growth of other nations, such as China and India, which are undergoing economic and political reforms that boost the credibility and viability of alternative currencies as safe, stable, and liquid reserves. Hence, a shift toward dedollarisation is altering the global balance of power, with the most severe adverse impact felt in the U.S., likely leading to a broad depreciation and underperformance of its financial assets relative to the rest of the world. While as of 2025 the US dollar is still dominant in foreign exchange market (88%), trade invoicing (40%), cross-border liabilities (48%), and foreign currency debt issuance (70%), its dominance is declining in the foreign currency reserves (from 90% in 1960 to 45% in 2023), the bond market (from earlier 50% to 30% in 2024), and commodity markets (especially in energy where nations like India, China, Brazil, Thailand and Indonesia buy discounted oil and gas discounted price by bypassing the SWIFT sanctions against Russia or Brazil and pay in own local currencies).

== Dedollarisation in international payments networks ==
The United States Department of the Treasury exercises considerable oversight over the SWIFT financial transfers network, and consequently has a huge sway on the global financial transactions systems, with the ability to impose economic sanctions on foreign entities and individuals. Many entities, such as BRICS, are working on creating an alternative to the SWIFT for a more balanced world. Their alternatives are:

- BRICS Pay: by BRICS member nations.
- Brazil's Pix
- Russia's SPFS
- India's SFMS
- China's CIPS: for RMB-related deals. 1467 financial institutions in 111 countries and regions have connected to the system. The actual business covers more than 4,200 banking institutions in 182 countries and regions around the world.

== Dedollarisation in commodities sector ==
Dedollarisation in commodities like energy (oil, gas, etc) and other commodities.

=== Argentina ===
Starting from early 2023, Argentina plans to join Brazil in paying for Chinese imports using the yuan instead of U.S. dollars. The country's goal is to safeguard its diminishing reserves of U.S. dollars. Argentina has been facing a significant decline in agricultural exports due to a severe drought, resulting in reduced inflow of dollars. In April 2023, Argentina intends to purchase approximately US$1 billion worth of Chinese imports using the yuan. Following that, the country aims to pay around $790 million worth of monthly imports in the Chinese yuan. After China and Argentina declared in April that their swap line had been opened, Argentina was able to utilise the equivalent of 1.04 billion yuan to pay for Chinese imports in May. The line was then increased to $18 billion over the following three years in June, during Sergio Massa's visit to China.

=== Brazil ===
In late March 2023, China and Brazil finalized an agreement to conduct trade using their respective currencies. In December 2023, Russia and China expressed 'their intent to abandon the US dollar in their bilateral transactions'. For several years, Russia had already been using the euro as a 'preferred settlement currency within BRICS'. In a similar vein, ASEAN members gathered in Indonesia to discuss strategies for reducing their reliance on the US dollar, euro, yen, and pound sterling in financial transactions, and instead promote the use of their domestic currencies. Additionally, India and Malaysia have also agreed to utilize the Indian rupee for their trade settlements, among other noteworthy developments.

=== Bolivia ===
In April 2023, Bolivian President Luis Arce revealed that the government is actively considering the adoption of China's yuan as an alternative to the U.S. dollar for conducting international trade. The decision stems from Bolivia's ongoing challenge of insufficient liquidity in domestic markets, with shortages of U.S. dollars escalating since early 2023, due to the declining net international reserves.

=== China ===
Since 2011, China is gradually shifting from trade in US dollar and in favour of the Chinese yuan, and in March 2018, China started buying oil in gold-backed yuan.

In March 2022, multiple reports claimed that Saudi Arabia was in talks with China about trading Saudi oil and gas to China in Chinese yuan instead of US dollars.

In December 2022 at the China - GCC Summit, General Secretary of the Chinese Communist Party Xi Jinping called for oil trade payments to be settled at Chinese yuan. China's Foreign Minister Wang Yi stated that Chinese-Arab relations experienced a "historic improvement."

In May 2023, China switched to the yuan to buy some US$88 billion worth of Russian oil, coal and metals.

=== Europe ===
Immediately at the start of the 2022 Russian invasion of Ukraine, mostly Western countries imposed heavy sanctions on Russian commodities and banking sector. As a response, on 31 March 2022 Russian president Vladimir Putin signed a decree mandating unfriendly countries from April 1 to pay the natural gas imports in rubles. European leaders have initially rejected paying for deliveries in rubles, marking that such a move would undermine sanctions already imposed on Moscow. In April 2022, four European gas companies made trade payment settlements in rubles.

=== Ghana ===
On 24 November 2022, Vice President Mahamudu Bawumia stated that they are working to buy oil in gold and he added "The barter of gold for oil represents a major structural change."

=== India ===
India is exploring ways to strengthen its economy by reducing its reliance on the US dollar. The country believes that decreasing demand for the dollar in international trade can help stabilize its national currency, the Indian rupee. India's leaders have taken note of the trend of de-dollarization among other countries and are now seeking to increase trade using their own currency. To achieve this goal, India plans to convert the rupee into a foreign currency and increase its share of global trade.

=== Iran ===
As a result of US sanctions, Iran has tried hard to reduce its reliance on the US dollar. The country has been seeking alternative ways or methods to conduct international trade utilizing diverse currencies such as the euro. The Islamic Republic of Iran is also striving to apply blockchain technology and digital currencies to bypass the international financial system and likewise to reduce the effect of sanctions.

In the aftermath of the U.S. and Israeli bombings, Iran has selectively closed off the Strait of Hormuz, unless countries negotiate safe passage and pay in Chinese yuan, potentially causing the erosion of the petrodollar.

=== Malaysia ===
Due to the fluctuations in the US dollar in recent years, countries like Malaysia are seeking an appropriate alternative to the dollar in global trade transactions to strengthen their economy. On the other hand, according to Malaysia, the de-dollarization and lower demand of the country in order to apply the dollar in commercial transactions will be able to provide the ground for the stabilization of the ringgit. The prime minister of the country mentioned that with the economic power given to Asian countries among China/Japan, there isn't any reason for Malaysia to remain dependent on the dollar, and on the other hand, the central banks of these two countries (i.e. China and Malaysia) have begun their discussions in regard to the implementation of trade in each other's currencies.

=== Russia ===
In August 2022, Turkey and Russia agreed to use rubles in trade of the natural gas.

In September 2022, Gazprom CEO Alexey Miller said that they have signed an agreement to make trade payments in rubles and yuan instead of US dollars.

In November 2022, Russian Deputy Prime Minister Alexander Novak confirmed that all gas supplied to China via Siberia are settled in rubles and yuan.

On March 23, 2022, Putin signed an order forbidding "non-friendly" countries (including EU countries, the United States and Norway) from buying Russian gas in any other currency besides the Russian ruble in the wake of sanctions given in aftermath of the country's invasion of Ukraine. As of 2022, Russia is the world's biggest gas exporter, making 17% of world gas export.

=== Saudi Arabia ===
In January 2023, Finance Minister of Saudi Arabia Mohammed Al-Jadaan stated that it is open to trade in other currencies besides the US dollar, and this expression is considered to be the first time in 48 years. Saudi Arabia accounts for more than 17% of the world's crude oil exports, with the majority directed towards Asia, especially to BRICS countries like China and India. As BRICS advocates for reducing reliance on the US dollar, there is growing speculation that Saudi Arabia might start using non-dollar currencies for its oil trade, particularly with these two nations.

=== Turkey ===
The Turkish president has introduced a fresh strategy to decrease dependence on the US dollar in global commerce. The aim is to establish trade without the use of the dollar with Turkey's international trading associates. The president has indicated a willingness to engage in trade with China using local currencies, indicating a shift away from the dollar. Additionally, talks have been held about the possibility of replacing the US dollar with another national currency in transactions with Iran. This choice is motivated by both political and economic factors, as Turkey strives to support its domestic currency by distancing itself from the US dollar.

=== Venezuela ===
In August 2018, Venezuela declared that it would price its oil in euros, yuan, rubles, and other currencies.

== Dedollarisation in forex reserves sector ==
In 2023, BNN Bloomberg reported that the reserve status of the US dollar was declining more rapidly than commonly acknowledged, with numerous analysts overlooking the significant exchange rate fluctuations from the previous year. The global share of US dollars in reserves decreased in 2022 at a rate ten times faster than the average speed observed over the past twenty years, as several nations sought alternative options following the sanctions imposed due to the Russian invasion of Ukraine. Accounting for exchange rate adjustments, the dollar had experienced an approximate 11% decrease in market share since 2016, doubling that figure since 2008. According to the IMF's Currency Composition of Official Foreign Exchange Reserves (COFER) survey the share of reserves held in U.S. dollars by central banks fell from 71 percent in 1999 to 59 percent in 2021.

=== China ===
Effective from 6 June 2023, China has said to its state-owned banks to substantially reduce the interest rates on US dollar deposits.

=== India ===
Instead of complete de-dollarization, India is strategically diversifying its foreign exchange reserves to reduce dependency on the US dollar through increasing gold reserves, multi-currency reserves, promoting the use of the rupee in international trade, and internationalization of its Unified Payments Interface (UPI) to reduce reliance on SWIFT vulnerable to US sanctions, Digital Rupee (e₹) and RuPay card for cross-border transactions.

=== Egypt ===
In May 2022, the Egyptian Minister of Finance Mohamed Maait announced the intention to issue bonds in yuan to raise capital as a mechanism to diversify the sources of finance.

=== Myanmar ===
In September 2022, the Chairman of the State Administration Council Min Aung Hlaing stated that they are planning to reduce US dollar reliance and to include trade in other foreign currencies. Apart from this there had been discussion to use Mir Payments system for payments.

=== Kazakhstan ===
In December 2015, the Kazakhstan government and national bank announced plans to reduce dollar dependency and strengthen the national currency. The joint statement of Kazakhstan government and national bank stated that their intent is to strengthen their national currency rather than focus on eliminating US dollars. In August 2016, after inflation surged to a 6-year high, the Kazakhstan central bank governor stated that it is a necessity to kickstart dedollarisation.

=== Russia ===
In June 2021, Russia stated it will eliminate the dollar from its National Wealth Fund to reduce vulnerability to international sanctions just two weeks before Russia's president Vladimir Putin held his first summit meeting with U.S. leader Joe Biden.

Russia had been planning to buy more yuan in the foreign exchange market in 2023 for trade settlements. The Russian Finance Ministry and Central Bank of Russia stated that it would sell around 54.5 billion rubles in foreign currency from January 2023.

== Dedollarisation through bilateral trade agreements ==
=== ASEAN ===
ASEAN, a group of 11 Southeast Asian countries in the region, such as Singapore, Malaysia, Indonesia, Cambodia, and Thailand, are currently contemplating the process of de-dollarization in order to diminish their dependence on the US dollar within their economies. These nations have voiced apprehensions regarding the volatility of the dollar's value and the American government's utilization of the dollar embargo mechanism. Consequently, they have developed a keen interest in mitigating their vulnerability to the dollar and exploring alternative currencies.

=== BRICS ===
BRICS, comprising ten countries, namely Brazil, Russia, India, China, South Africa, Indonesia, Iran, United Arab Emirates, Egypt, and Ethiopia, have commenced dedollarisation by using local currencies facilitated by the BRICS Pay system instead of US-controlled SWIFT. In 2024, 90% of Russia's trade within BRICS was in local currencies, China-India commenced rupee-yuan trade agreements, Brazil is using its real, and other member nations are using local currencies.

- India-UAE:

India and the UAE are in talks to apply rupees in order to trade non-oil commodities in a shift away from the dollar.

- China-Brazil:

In March 2013, during the BRICS summit, Brazil made an agreement with China to trade in Brazilian real and Chinese yuan. In 2023, Brazil and China entered into a preliminary agreement to trade in national currencies instead of US dollars.

At the 2026 BRICS summit in New Delhi, member states discussed expanding the use of local currencies in trade and continued work on mechanisms for cross-border payments. The summit declaration did not announce a common BRICS currency or establish binding targets for local-currency settlement. CNBC reported that Russia and China settle close to 90% of their bilateral trade in rubles and renminbi, although analysts said this shift had been driven largely by sanctions imposed on Russia rather than by a coordinated BRICS-wide policy. CNBC also reported that limited liquidity in BRICS currencies, capital controls, trade imbalances and differing economic priorities among member states remained obstacles to broader dedollarisation. Despite increased use of local currencies in some bilateral trade, the U.S dollar remained on one side of 89.2% of global foreign-exchange transactions in the Bank for International Settlements' April 2025 survey.

=== SCO ===
97% of trade in 2025 among the Shanghai Cooperation Organisation (SCO) nations - which has 10 full members, including India, Russia, China, Iran, Pakistan, Kazakhstan, Kyrgyzstan, Tajikistan, Uzbekistan, and Belarus - was in local currencies, not in USD or Euro. This helps circumvent Western nation's weaponisation of economic sanctions and SWIFT system, more sovereignty, faster transections with lower transaction costs, cheaper energy fuel sourced and supplied within SCO nation, and this also sets the framework which can be replicated with other nations, etc.

- India-Russia:

During the Cold War, and ending in 1991, the Soviet Union and India traded in a rupee-ruble exchange. Mutual trading between India and Russia is done mostly in Russian rubles and Indian rupees instead of dollars and euros. In March 2022, India and Russia entered for a Rupee–Ruble Trade Arrangement, In which India buys Russian oil in UAE dirham and also in rubles.

- Russia-Iran:

In July 2022, Russia and Iran made modifications in their bilateral trade to reduce the dependency on the US dollar. The new monetary system could mean the debts may be settled in their own countries and could reduce the demand for US dollars by 3 billion a year. In January 2023, Russia and Iran were planning to trade with gold-backed cryptocurrencies as an alternative to the US dollar.

- China-Pakistan:

The power minister of Pakistan announced that the country is considering using yuan to pay for its imports of Russian crude oil.

=== Brazil ===
Brazil is member of BRICS multilateral organisation, which actively pursue trade in local currencies with member nations. It also has bilateral local currency trade arrangements with the following nations.

- Brazil-Argentina:

In 2023, Argentina and Brazil proposed a common currency for trade which is termed as sur. Sur combines the currency of Argentina's peso and Brazil's real.

=== China ===
China is member of both BRICS and SCO multilateral organisations, both of which actively pursue trade in local currencies with member nations. It also has bilateral local currency trade arrangements with the following nations.

- China-Australia:

In 2013, Australia made an agreement with China to trade in national currencies.

- China-France:

In a significant development, it has been reported that a French company has conducted a transaction with China National Offshore Oil Corporation recently, exporting liquefied natural gas (LNG) and accepting payment in Chinese yuan. The mentioned transaction highlights the growing trend of de-dollarization, which is also making its way into the European Union.

=== India ===
India is member of both BRICS and SCO multilateral organisations, both of which actively pursue trade in local currencies with member nations. It also has bilateral local currency trade arrangements with the several nations. India facilitates bilateral trade in local currencies, for reducing transection cost and to mitigate dollar rate conversion rate volatility leading to dedollarisation, using two mechanism - Local Currency Settlement Agreement (LCSA) and Special Rupee Vostro Accounts (SRVA) to enable rupee-denominated trade. India also interfaces India's Unified Payments Interface (UPI) with these nation's payment platforms.

- Local Currency Settlement Agreement (LCSA) - at least 7 nations in 2024:

- Africa: Nigeria (India's second-largest trading partner in Africa) Tanzania,

- Asia: Indonesia, Bhutan, Malaysia, Nepal, United Arab Emirates (UAE),

- Special Rupee Vostro Account (SRVA) arrangement - at least 26 countries in 2024:

In August 2025, the RBI simplified the process by allowing AD Category-I banks to open SRVAs for correspondent banks without seeking prior RBI approval. Additionally, in October 2025, the RBI permitted SRVA balance holders to invest in corporate debt securities, expanding beyond the previously allowed government securities.

- Asia: Bangladesh, Israel, Kazakhstan, Malaysia, Maldives, Myanmar, Oman, Russia, Singapore, Sri Lanka, Tajikistan.

- Africa: Botswana, Kenya, Mauritius, Seychelles, Sudan, Tanzania, Uganda

- Americas: Cuba;

- Europe: Belarus, Germany, Luxembourg, United Kingdom;

- Oceania: Fiji, New Zealand

- South America: Guyana

=== Indonesia ===
Indonesia is member of BRICS multilateral organisation, which actively pursues trade in local currencies with member nations. It also has bilateral local currency trade arrangements with the following nations.

- Indonesia-South Korea:

In early May 2023, the central banks of South Korea and Indonesia entered into a memorandum of understanding aimed at fostering collaboration in advancing the utilization of their respective currencies for bilateral transactions moving away from the US dollar as an intermediary. This includes promoting the use of their currencies for activities like current account transactions and direct investment between the two countries.

=== Iran ===
Iran is member of both BRICS and SCO multilateral organisations, both of which actively pursue trade in local currencies with member nations. It also has bilateral local currency trade arrangements with the following nations.

- Iran-EU:

INSTEX was a scheme that was put in place in 2019 to allow EU trade with Iran. In March 2020, the first and only Iran-EU INSTEX transaction was concluded. It covered an import of medical equipment to combat the COVID-19 outbreak in Iran. European countries said in March 2023, that they had decided to end INSTEX in order to protect companies doing business with Iran from US sanctions, though only that single transaction was conducted through the system.

=== Russia ===
Russia is member of both BRICS and SCO multilateral organisations, both of which actively pursue trade in local currencies with member nations. It also has bilateral local currency trade arrangements with the following nations.

- Russia with Australia-Japan:

Russia made agreements with Australia, Russia, Japan, Brazil, and Iran to trade in national currencies. It has been reported that in the first quarter of 2020 the share of the US dollar in the bilateral trade between China and Russia fell below 50 percent for the first time. In 2011, Japan made an agreement with China to trade in national currencies. Sino-Japanese trade had a value of US$300 billion.

== Dedollarisation of dollar-denominated assets ==
As academic Tim Beal summarizes, many commentators view the United States' overly broad imposition of financial sanctions as a factor increasing dedollarisation because of responses like the Russian-developed System for Transfers of Financial Messages (SPFS), the China-supported Cross-Border Interbank Payment System (CIPS), and the European Instrument in Support of Trade Exchanges (INSTEX, dissolved in 2023) that followed the United States' withdrawal of from the Joint Comprehensive Plan of Action (JCPOA) with Iran.

=== Russia ===
The Russian Federation accelerated the process of dedollarisation in 2014 as a result of worsening relations with the West. In 2017, SPFS, a Russian replacement of the SWIFT financial transfer system, was developed by the Central Bank of Russia. The system had been in development since 2014, after the United States government threatened to disconnect Russia from the SWIFT system. Lukoil, a state-owned company, had announced that it will find a replacement for the dollar.

On March 17, 2022, Anatoly Aksakov, Chairman of the State Duma Committee on the Financial Market, announced that the Central Bank of Russia and the People's Bank of China are working on connecting the Russian and Chinese financial messaging systems. He also pointed to the beginning of the development of information transfer schemes using blockchains, including the digital ruble and the digital yuan. On March 31, 2022, The Economic Times published information that India has offered Russia a new transaction system with the transfer of trade to the ruble and SPFS, which will work through the Reserve Bank of India and Russia's Vnesheconombank. According to the same data, the system will be put into operation within a week.

On March 30, 2023, Deputy Chairman of the State Duma Alexander Babakov on the sidelines of the Russian Indian Business Forum in New Delhi stated that the BRICS countries can create a new currency that will be backed not by gold but by real resources, including land and rare-earth metals.

=== Zimbabwe ===
After a year of the RTGS Dollar having been the only legal tender, Zimbabwe adopted dollarization due to hyperinflation. In June 2019, it also reduced the usage of a multicurrency system and preferred to switch to the US dollar. In an interview with former Finance Minister Tendai Biti, he pointed out that dedollarisation has failed dismally.

In 2022, Zimbabwe introduced a new form of currency made with gold, the Mosi-oa-Tunya, to reduce inflation since the local currency had considerably weakened. The governor of the Reserve Bank John Mangudya said that the gold coins will contain one troy ounce of 22-carat gold, and that trade could be carried out both locally and internationally.

=== Other countries ===
Chile has focused its efforts on introducing indexed instruments to attract investors' attention away from dollar-denominated assets. The majority of these instruments have been linked to the consumer price index (CPI) by establishing a unit of account known as the 'Unidad de Fomento' (UFs).

== Reaction ==
Evidence from economics researcher Jonathan Hartley published in June 2023 shows that the US dollar share of central bank reserves, global debt securities, and foreign exchange trading are unchanged since the 2022 Russian invasion of Ukraine and sanctions of Russian reserve assets. In the case of central bank reserves, the US dollar share of central bank reserves is 10% higher as of July 2023 than it was in the early 1990s.

In April 2023, Brazilian President Luiz Inácio Lula da Silva strongly criticized the prevailing dominance of the dollar. In a speech delivered from a podium adorned with the flags of Brazil, Russia, India, China, and South Africa, collectively known as the BRICS nations, he urged the largest developing economies to collaborate and propose an alternative currency to replace the greenback in international trade. President Lula da Silva questioned the decision-making process that led to the dollar becoming the primary trade currency after the abandonment of the gold standard.

On May 24, 2023, IMF Managing director Kristalina Georgieva stated that "We don't expect a rapid shift in reserves because the reason the dollar is a reserve currency is because of the strength of the US economy and the depth of its capital markets."

On June 6, 2023, JP Morgan stated that "De-dollarization is evident in FX reserves where USD share has declined to a record as share in exports declined, but it is still emerging in commodities."

On July 11, 2023, S&P Chief Economist Paul Gruenwald stated that "The U.S. (dollar) will continue to be a leading world currency, (but) it will no longer be the dominant world currency."

During the 2026 Iran war, Harvard economist Kenneth Rogoff criticized Operation Economic Outcast as showing "signs of panic" instead of a "signal of strength" and signalling "the beginning of the end of the 'Pax Dollar' era." In a written interview with The Chosun Daily, he expressed his belief that the U.S. could accelerate dedollarisation in its attempt to weaponise the U.S. dollar against China, noting that the declaration of a full-scale financial war by the U.S. could make China and Europe hasten to expand their own international financial systems. He also highlighted the possibility of China using the Cross-Border Interbank Payment System for transactions with Iran and the likelihood of its retaliation against the U.S. with its leverage in the global supply of rare earths and the pharmaceutical sector.

=== Redollarisation ===
Economists at Standard Chartered have pointed out a trend of redollarisation rather than dedollarisation in the global financial system. Divya Devesh, co-head of foreign exchange research for ASEAN and South Asia at the bank, has noted that exporters tend to retain dollars and find U.S. equities to be an attractive investment, citing Taiwan as an example. Eric Robertsen, the bank's chief strategist and global head of research, has said that the alternatives to the U.S. dollar are not very appealing, predicting that the currency is not going to lose its status in the near or medium term.

== See also ==
- BRICS Pay – Distributed payment messaging mechanism system
- Central bank digital currency (CBDC) – Digital form of fiat money
- Criticism of the Federal Reserve
- Cross-Border Interbank Payment System
- Currency substitution – Use of a foreign currency in parallel to or instead of a domestic currency
- Stablecoin – Type of cryptocurrency that is reserve backed
- Withdrawal from the eurozone – Member state ceases use of the euro as its currency
- World currency – Currency that is widely used internationally
- Gold repatriation – Relocation of sovereign gold reserves
