= List of protected heritage sites in La Hulpe =

This table shows an overview of the protected heritage sites in the Walloon town Terhulpen, or La Hulpe. This list is part of Belgium's national heritage.

Object	Year/architect	Town/section	Address	Coordinates	Number^{?}	Image
Tower, high nave and the choir of the church of Saint-Nicolas in La Hulpe ^{(nl)} ^{(fr)}		Terhulpen		50.731388°N 4.490532°E	25050-CLT-0001-01 Info	Toren, het hoge schip en het koor van de kerk Saint-Nicolas, te La Hulpe
Domaine Solvay in La Hulpe ^{(nl)} ^{(fr)}		Terhulpen		50.745536°N 4.445498°E	25050-CLT-0002-01 Info	Domaine van Solvay, te La Hulpe
Ensemble of the domain "Longfond", in La Hulpe ^{(nl)} ^{(fr)}		Terhulpen		50.745536°N 4.445498°E	25050-CLT-0003-01 Info	Ensemble van het domein "Longfond", te La Hulpe
Ensemble of the domain Nysdam and surrounding area ^{(nl)} ^{(fr)}		Terhulpen		50.726874°N 4.456486°E	25050-CLT-0004-01 Info	
Valley of Argentine: flow of the stream and wetlands Gaillemarde over the creek and the ponds, from the road to Brussels up to the road rue F. Dubois, including the large pond Papeteries ^{(nl)} ^{(fr)}		Terhulpen		50.722634°N 4.436742°E	25050-CLT-0006-01 Info	Vallei van Argentine: stroom van de beek en rietvelden Gaillemarde meer dan de kreek en de vijvers, omdat de Brusselse weg naar rue F. Dubois, waaronder de grote vijver Papeteries
Pump Victor Horta, on the Solvay Estate in La Hulpe ^{(nl)} ^{(fr)}		Terhulpen		50.733196°N 4.459353°E	25050-CLT-0007-01 Info	
Ensemble of the Soignes forest and the Bois des Capucins in the territory of the municipalities Auderghem, Duisbourg, Hoeilaart, La Hulpe, Rhode-Saint Genèse, Tervuren, Uccle, Waterloo, Watermael Boitsfort and Woluwe-Saint-Pierre ^{(nl)} ^{(fr)}		Terhulpen		50.729909°N 4.419371°E	25050-CLT-0008-01 Info	
The domain of Solvay ^{(nl)} ^{(fr)}		Terhulpen		50.745536°N 4.445498°E	25050-PEX-0001-01 Info	Het domein van Solvay
Ensemble of the domain Nysdam and surrounding area ^{(nl)} ^{(fr)}		Terhulpen		50.726874°N 4.456486°E	25050-PEX-0002-01 Info	
Soignes forest area ^{(nl)} ^{(fr)}		Terhulpen		50.729909°N 4.419371°E	25050-PEX-0003-01 Info	

== See also ==
- Lists of protected heritage sites in Walloon Brabant
- La Hulpe
