= Cross-Border Interbank Payment System =

Financial markets payment system

- Native name: 跨境银行间支付清算有限责任公司
- Romanized name: kuà jìng yínháng jiān zhīfù qīngsuàn yǒuxiàn zérèn gōngsī
- Type: Cooperative
- Industry: Telecommunications
- Founded: 2015
- Headquarters: Shanghai, China
- Products: Financial telecommunication
- Website: cips.com.cn/en

The Cross-border Interbank Payment System (CIPS; Chinese: 跨境银行间支付清算有限责任公司) is a Chinese payment system that offers clearing and settlement services for its participants in cross-border renminbi (RMB) payments and trade. CIPS is backed by the People's Bank of China and was launched in 2015 as part of a policy effort to internationalize the use of China's currency.

In 2022, CIPS processed around 96.7 trillion yuan (US$14.03 trillion), with about 1427 financial institutions in 109 countries and regions having connected to the system.

In 2023, the CIPS processed 6.6133 million transactions, totaling RMB123.06 trillion (US$17.09 trillion), increasing by 50.29 percent and 27.27 percent y-o-y, respectively. On a daily basis, the system processed 25,900 transactions, totaling RMB482.602 billion (US$67.028 billion).

In 2024, the CIPS processed 8.2169 million transactions, totaling RMB175.49 trillion (US$24.47 trillion), increasing by 24.25 percent and 42.60 percent y-o-y, respectively. On a daily basis, the system processed 30500 transactions, totaling RMB652.390 billion (US$90.95 billion).

As of June 2025, CIPS has 176 Direct Participants and 1514 Indirect Participants. Among Indirect Participants, 1102 participants are from Asia (including 563 in mainland China), 261 from Europe, 61 from Africa, 34 from North America, 34 from South America, and 22 from Oceania.

In 2025, the CIPS processed 8.4419 million transactions, totaling RMB180.15 trillion, increasing by 1.02 percent and 1.02 percent y-o-y, respectively. On a daily basis, the system processed 31900 transactions, totaling RMB679.821 billion.

CIPS participants are located in 121 countries and regions around the world. Business covers more than 4900 banking institutions in 189 countries and regions around the world, including both direct and indirect members.

== History ==
In 2012, the PBOC launched the construction of CIPS (phase 1). On 8 October 2015, CIPS (phase 1) was put into operation, with 19 direct participants and 176 indirect participants from 50 countries and regions across 6 continents. The launch of CIPS was another milestone in the construction of China's financial market infrastructure, which marked vital progress in developing China's modern payment system that integrated domestic, and overseas payments of RMB. CIPS significantly facilitated RMB being officially included in the special drawing rights (SDR).

In March 2016, SWIFT and CIPS signed a memorandum of understanding (MOU). With the ISO 20022 standard already adopted by CIPS for its payment system, SWIFT went through the implementation process of the standard that can allow the use of Chinese characters, in addition to its richer content functionalities.

In September 2017, as one of the MOU's plans signed between SWIFT and CIPS, reference data indicating financial institutions' direct and indirect participation in CIPS will be published via SWIFTRef and updated on a monthly basis. This data covers BIC, LEI, national bank codes, IBAN data, standing settlement instructions, credit ratings, and financial institutions' memberships to domestic and cross-border payment market infrastructures.

After the launch of CIPS (phase 1), its functions have been steadily improved, leading to its operation (phase 2).

On 26 March 2018, CIPS (phase 2) was launched on a pilot basis, with 10 direct participants. On 2 May 2018, CIPS (phase 2) was fully operational with other qualified direct participants. On 9 October, CIPS (phase 2) implemented the Delivery Versus Payment (DVP) settlement and supported Northbound Trading of Bond Connect, which would reduce settlement risks and improve the efficiency of cross-border bond transactions.

By the end of 2019, CIPS had 33 direct and 903 indirect participants (from 94 countries and regions) with an increase of 74% and 413% compared to 2015, respectively. Through these direct and indirect participants, the network of CIPS has reached 3000+ banking institutions in 167 countries and regions. By the end of 2019, 1017 banking institutions from 59 BRI countries and regions (including mainland China, Hong Kong SAR, Macao SAR, and Taiwan) ran their business via CIPS.

In 2021, CIPS processed around 80 trillion yuan (US$12.68 trillion), with about 1280 financial institutions in 103 countries and regions having connected to the system.

In 2022, CIPS processed around 96.7 trillion yuan (US$14.03 trillion), with about 1427 financial institutions in 109 countries and regions having connected to the system.

In 2023, the CIPS processed 6.6133 million transactions, totaling RMB123.06 trillion (US$17.09 trillion), increasing by 50.29 percent and 27.27 percent y-o-y, respectively. On a daily basis, the system processed 25,900 transactions, totaling RMB482.602 billion (US$67.028 billion).

In 2024, the CIPS processed 8.2169 million transactions, totaling RMB175.49 trillion (US$24.47 trillion), increasing by 24.25 percent and 42.60 percent y-o-y, respectively. On a daily basis, the system processed 30500 transactions, totaling RMB652.390 billion (US$90.95 billion).

In 2025, the CIPS processed 8.4419 million transactions, totaling RMB180.15 trillion, increasing by 1.02 percent and 1.02 percent y-o-y, respectively. On a daily basis, the system processed 31900 transactions, totaling RMB679.821 billion.

== Standards ==
CIPS relies on SWIFT's messaging service for over 80% of its transactions. It uses the SWIFT industry standard for syntax in financial messages. Messages formatted to SWIFT standards can be read and processed by many well-known financial processing systems, whether or not the message traveled over the SWIFT network. SWIFT cooperates with international organizations to define standards for message format and content. CIPS also subscribes to registration authority (RA) for the following ISO standards:

- ISO 9362: 1994 Banking, Banking telecommunication messages, Bank identifier codes
- ISO 10383: 2003 Securities and related financial instruments, Codes for exchanges and market identification (MIC)
- ISO 13616: 2003 IBAN Registry
- ISO 15022: 1999 Securities, Scheme for messages (Data Field Dictionary) (replaces ISO 7775)
- ISO 20022-1: 2004 and ISO 20022-2:2007 Financial services, UnIversal Financial Industry message scheme

== Products ==
The main functions of the CIPS is to facilitate the processing of cross-border RMB business and to support the settlement of cross-border trade in goods and services, cross-border direct investment, cross-border financing, and cross-border individual remittance.

=== CIPS Connector ===
Based on the message scheme of ISO20022, and compatible with the current CIPS standards, CIPS Connector is the information exchange component between CIPS Direct/Indirect Participants and their institutional clients, and the application carrier of CIPS Standard.

==== Function ====
- Customer Credit Transfer
- Financial Institution Transfer
- Query and Answer
- Account Statement
- Information Value-added Service
- Other Application Scenarios

== Participants ==
CIPS participants are divided into two types: direct participants and indirect participants. Direct participants open an account in the CIPS, and directly send and receive messages through the CIPS, while indirect participants have indirect access to services provided by the CIPS through direct participants.

As of June 2025, CIPS has 176 Direct Participants and 1514 Indirect Participants. Among Indirect Participants, 1102 participants are from Asia (including 563 in mainland China), 261 from Europe, 61 from Africa, 34 from North America, 34 from South America, and 22 from Oceania.

CIPS participants are located in 121 countries and regions around the world. Business covers more than 4900 banking institutions in 189 countries and regions around the world.

== Ownership ==
CIPS has Chinese and international shareholders. Being directly linked to the Chinese Communist Party, the People's Bank of China is the largest shareholder with 16 percent of equity; others include the NAFMII, UnionPay, and the large state-owned Chinese banks. Foreign shareholders include HSBC, Standard Chartered, Bank of East Asia, DBS Bank, Citigroup, ANZ Banking Group, and BNP Paribas.

== Geo-economic implications ==
As academic Tim Beal summarizes, CIPS is among the responses to sanctions imposed by the United States, which commentators view as contributing to de-dollarization.

== See also ==
- Bilateral key exchange
- Electronic money
- ISO 9362 (the SWIFT/BIC code standard), ISO 15022, and ISO 20022
- China Foreign Exchange Trade System (CFETS)
- Society for Worldwide Interbank Financial Telecommunication (SWIFT)
- SPFS (Russia)
- Structured Financial Messaging System (India)
- Value transfer system
