= ISO 9362 =

SWIFT business identifier coding standard

ISO 9362 is an international standard for Business Identifier Codes (BIC), a unique identifier for business institutions, approved by the International Organization for Standardization (ISO). BIC is also known as SWIFT-BIC, SWIFT ID, or SWIFT code, after the Society for Worldwide Interbank Financial Telecommunication (SWIFT), which is designated by ISO as the BIC registration authority. BIC was defined originally as a Bank Identifier Code and is most often assigned to financial organizations; when it is assigned to a non-financial organization, the code may also be known as a Business Entity Identifier (BEI). These codes are used when transferring money between banks, particularly for international wire transfers, and also for the exchange of other messages between banks. The codes can sometimes be found on account statements.

The overlapping issue between ISO 9362 and ISO 13616 is discussed in the article International Bank Account Number (also called IBAN). The SWIFT network does not require a specific format for the transaction so the identification of accounts and transaction types is left to agreements of the transaction partners. In the process of the Single Euro Payments Area the European central banks have agreed on a common format based on IBAN and BIC including an XML-based transmission format for standardized transactions. T2 (RTGS) is a joint gross clearing system in the European Union that does not require the SWIFT network for transmission (see EBICS). The TARGET directory lists all the BICs of the banks that are attached to the TARGET2-network being a subset of the SWIFT-directory of BICs.

== History ==
There are five versions.

- ISO 9362:1987, from year 1987, withdrawn
- ISO 9362:1994, from year 1994, withdrawn
- ISO 9362:2009, from year 2009, withdrawn
- ISO 9362:2014, from year 2014, withdrawn
- ISO 9362:2022, from year 2022, valid

ISO 9362 is based on the industry standard created by SWIFT around 1975.

== Structure ==
The SWIFT code is 8 or 11 characters, made up of:

- 4 letters: institution code or bank code.
- 2 letters: ISO 3166-1 alpha-2 country code (exceptionally, SWIFT has assigned the code XK to Republic of Kosovo, which does not have an ISO 3166-1 country code)
- 2 letters or digits: location code
  - if the second character is "0", then it is typically a test BIC as opposed to a BIC used on the live network.
  - if the second character is "1", then it denotes a passive participant in the SWIFT network
  - if the second character is "2", then it typically indicates a reverse billing BIC, where the recipient pays for the message as opposed to the more usual mode whereby the sender pays for the message.
- 3 letters or digits: branch code, optional ('XXX' for primary office)

Where an eight character code is given, it may be assumed that it refers to the primary office.

SWIFT Standards, a division of The Society for Worldwide Interbank Financial Telecommunication (SWIFT), handles the registration of these codes. Because SWIFT originally introduced what was later standardized as Business Identifier Codes (BICs), they are still often called SWIFT addresses or codes.

The 2009 update of ISO 9362 broadened the scope to include non-financial institutions; before then BIC was commonly understood to be an acronym for Bank Identifier Code.

There are over 7,500 "live" codes (for partners actively connected to the SWIFT network) and an estimated 10,000 additional BIC codes which can be used for manual transactions.

== Examples ==
Deutsche Bank is an international bank, with its head office in Frankfurt, Germany. The SWIFT code for its primary office is DEUTDEFF:

- DEUT identifies Deutsche Bank
- DE is the country code for Germany
- FF is the code for Frankfurt

Deutsche Bank uses an extended code of 11 characters and has assigned branches or processing areas individual extended codes. This allows the payment to be directed to a specific office. For example, DEUTDEFF500 would direct the payment to an office of Deutsche Bank in Bad Homburg.

Nedbank is a primarily South African bank, with its head office in Johannesburg. The SWIFT code for its primary office is NEDSZAJJ:

- NEDS identifies Nedbank
- ZA is the country code for South Africa
- JJ is the code for Johannesburg

Nedbank has not implemented the extended code of 11 characters and all SWIFT transfers to its accounts are directed to the primary office for processing. Those transfer interfaces that require an 11 digit code would enter NEDSZAJJXXX.

Danske Bank is a primarily Danish bank, with its head office in Copenhagen. The SWIFT code for its primary office is DABADKKK:

- DABA identifies Danske Bank
- DK is the country code for Denmark
- KK (for København in Danish) is the code for Copenhagen.

UniCredit Banca is a primarily Italian bank with its head office in Milan. The SWIFT code for its primary office is UNCRITMM:

- UNCR identifies Unicredit Banca
- IT is the country code for Italy
- MM is the code for Milan.

Dah Sing Bank is a bank based in Hong Kong that has five branches in mainland China (primary mainland China branch in Shenzhen). The SWIFT code for the branch in Shanghai is DSBACNBXSHA.

- DSBA identifies Dah Sing Bank
- CN is the country code for China
- BXSHA is the code for Shanghai.

It uses the 11-digit extended code, and SHA identifies the Shanghai branch.

BDO Unibank is the biggest bank in the Philippines, with its head office in Makati. The SWIFT Code for BDO is BNORPHMM. All BDO branches have the same SWIFT Code.

- BNOR identifies BDO Unibank
- PH is the country code for the Philippines
- MM is the code for Metro Manila of which Makati is a part.

Note that one bank can seem to have more than one bank identifier in a given country for separation purposes. Bank of East Asia separates its representative branch in the US and its US-based operations for local customers into BEASUS33xxx (following the code used in its home country) and BEAKUS33xxx respectively. This differs from its local mainland China operations which are also BEASCNxxxxx following Hong Kong rather than having a separate identifier code.

- An example of this is Bank of America in the United States. For US Dollar denominated wires, its SWIFT code is BOFAUS3N. The SWIFT code for wires sent in foreign currency (non-U.S. dollars) to Bank of America in the United States is BOFAUS6S.

In the past, SEPA payments required both BIC and IBAN. Since 2016-02-01 only the IBAN is needed inside the SEPA (European Union and some more countries).

== Twelve-character SWIFTNet FIN address based on BIC ==
To identify endpoints on its network, SWIFT also uses twelve-character codes that are derived from the BIC of the institution. Such a code consists of the 'BIC8', followed by a one-character code that identifies the Logical Terminal (LT), (also referred to as "local destination" or "Logical Terminal address"), and the three-character branch code. While 'BIC12's are not part of the ISO standard, and are only relevant in the context of the messaging platform, they play a role in FIN system messaging. According to SWIFT, Logical Terminals are the "entity through which users send and receive FIN messages.", thus, may play a role within routing of the message.

== Usage ==
Business Identifier Codes are primarily used for identifying financial and non-financial institutions involving day-to-day business transactions among one or more institutions in transaction lifecycle.

Example: In SWIFT messages these BICs are embedded within the messages. Consider the message type for cash transfer MT103, here we can find BIC under different tags like 50a (ordering customer), 56a (intermediary), 57a (account with institution), etc.

== See also ==
- Authoritative Legal Entity Identifier (ALEI)
- Bank account
- Bank Identification Number (BIN)
- Cross-Border Inter-Bank Payments System (China International Payments System) (CIPS)
- Data Universal Numbering System
- Financial Stability Board
- International Bank Account Number (IBAN)
- International Business Registration Number (IBRN)
- ISO 8000-116
- Legal Entity Identifier
- Society for Worldwide Interbank Financial Telecommunication (SWIFT)
- Unique Entity Identifier
- Value transfer system
