= BKE =

BKE may refer to:

- New York Stock Exchange symbol for Buckle (clothing retailer)
- Butterworth–Kulim Expressway, an interstate expressway in Malaysia
- Bukit Timah Expressway, an expressway in Singapore
- International Air Transport Association code for Baker City Municipal Airport, Baker City, Oregon
- Bilateral key exchange, an encryption scheme
