= Carl Reuterskiöld =

Swedish banker and engineer

- Born: Carl Lennart Adam Emanuel Reuterskiöld; 15 May 1923; Sweden
- Died: 20 March 2006 (aged 82)
- Occupation: Banker
- Known for: Founding and being the first CEO of SWIFT
- Spouse: Dagmar Malmström (m. 1948)
- Children: 1

Carl Lennart Adam Emanuel "Charlie" Reuterskiöld (15 May 1923 – 20 March 2006) was a Swedish banker and engineer that was the founding CEO of the Belgium-based Society for Worldwide Interbank Financial Telecommunication (SWIFT), a position which he held for a decade from SWIFT's founding in 1973 until 1983.

== Career ==
=== Prior to SWIFT ===
Before leading SWIFT, Carl Reuterskiöld was Vice President of the International banking and card division for Systems and Communications worldwide at American Express.

=== SWIFT ===
Carl Reuterskiöld was the founding CEO of SWIFT from 1973 onwards. Founded by 239 banks from 15 countries, SWIFT was a cooperative that sought to transition the long distance interbank messaging from the slow, manual and insecure telex system of the day toward a more reliable and automated messaging system. In 1976 he oversaw the opening of SWIFT's first operating centres. In 1979 he inaugurated SWIFT's United States Operating Centre in Virginia, in conjunction with the then state Governor of Virginia, John N. Dalton. In 1982 he announced that SWIFT had finally achieved financial stability and welcomed Banque Nationale de Belgique as the 1000th member of SWIFT. He retired in 1983.

== Private life ==
Carl Reuterskiöld had residences in La Hulpe (Belgium), Cannes (France) and Virginia (United States).

In 1948, he married Dagmar Malmström (1926–?), with whom he had a son, Didrik. He died peacefully on 20 March 2006, at the age of 82.

== See also ==
- Society for Worldwide Interbank Financial Telecommunication
