= Bessel Kok =

Dutch businessman and chess organiser

Bessel Kok (born 13 December 1941 in Hilversum) is a Dutch businessman and chess organiser living in Prague. He has served in top management positions in telecommunications companies in Belgium (Belgacom) and in the Czech Republic. He was also President of the Belgian-based Banking communications company SWIFT and responsible for SWIFT's sponsorship of several major International chess events.

Kok was the Chairman of World Chess Grandmaster Association from 1985 until 1991, and helped to establish the 2002 Prague Agreement concerning the World Chess Championship.

Kok is also active in the arts. He was the producer of the film The Power of Good: Nicholas Winton about British businessman Nicholas Winton who rescued children from the Nazis. The film won an Emmy Award in 2002.

Kok ran a campaign for presidency of the World Chess Federation against the incumbent Kirsan Ilyumzhinov in 2006. The election was held in June 2006, in Turin, Italy during the World Chess Olympiad and Kok lost 54–96 to Ilyumzhinov.

As of 2013, Bessel Kok was an Executive Chairman of the pro cycling team Omega Pharma Quick-Step. He is also Chairman of the related Bakala Academy, a center for sport development.

In 2004, he organized the Cow Parade art exhibition in Prague.
