= Informal value transfer system =

Nonconventional banking system

An informal value transfer system (IVTS) is any system, mechanism, or network of people that receives money for the purpose of making the funds or an equivalent value payable to a third party in another geographic location, whether or not in the same form. Informal value transfers generally take place outside of the conventional banking system through non-bank financial institutions or other business entities whose primary business activity may not be the transmission of money. The IVTS transactions occasionally interconnect with formal banking systems, such as through the use of bank accounts held by the IVTS operator.

== History ==
An informal value transfer system is an alternative and unofficial remittance and banking system, that pre-dates current day modern banking systems. The systems were established as a means of settling accounts within villages and between villages. It existed as far back as over 4000 years ago and even more.

Their use as global networks for financial transactions spread as expatriates from the original countries settled abroad. Today, IVTS operations are found in most countries. Depending on the ethnic group, IVTS are called by a variety of names including, for example, hawala (Middle East, Afghanistan, Indian Sub-Continent); fei ch’ien (飞钱 or "flying money"; China); phoe kuan (Thailand); and Black Market Peso Exchange (South America).

Individuals or groups engaged in operating IVTS may do so on a full-time, part-time, or ad hoc basis. They may work independently, or as part of a multi-person network. IVTS are based on trust. In general, operators usually don't misappropriate the funds entrusted to them.

== Mechanism ==
The sender gives money to an IVTS agent and their counterpart in the receiver region/country acts as deliverer of this money. The sender calls or faxes instructions to his counterpart and the money gets delivered in a matter of a few hours. In the past, the message could be delivered using couriers, with men or even animals (such as pigeons). Settlements are made either with a private delivery service or wire transfer in the opposite direction. Another method of balancing the books is to under-invoice goods shipped abroad, so that the receiver can resell the products at a higher market price.

== Adoption ==
IVTS are used by a variety of individuals, businesses, organisations, and even governments to remit funds domestically and abroad. Expatriates and immigrants often use IVTS to send money back to their families and friends in their home countries (for workers who worked abroad) or foreign countries (for merchants who need extra money to start a business). IVTS operations are also used by legitimate companies, traders, organisations, and government agencies needing to conduct business in countries with basic or no formal financial systems.

In some countries, IVTS-type networks operate in parallel with formal financial institutions or as a substitute or alternative for them or. Besides citizens of the host country, people (legally or illegally) residing in the host country from foreign countries may prefer or need to use IVTS in lieu of formal financial institutions for various reasons as described below:

- the host country and the receiving country have no diplomatic ties or the host country actively discourage the sending of money to the receiving country.
- the constant change in the world political environments, unsatisfiable payment systems, and/or a rapid continuously changing financial sector;
- a lack of easily accessible formal financial institutions in remote areas of some countries;
- transfers that are more efficient, reliable, and cheaper than formal financial institutions. (For example, a wire transfer of funds using banks involves fees charged to the sender and receiver, may take from two to seven days to complete, and may be delayed or lost. Funds moved through IVTS are usually available within 24 hours, with minimal or no fees charged to the participants);
- to avoid paying higher foreign exchange rates. (Funds sent through traditional transfers are converted to the currency of the recipient’s country; the fee charged for exchange rate conversion is set by the institution. IVTS operators, who speculate in currency exchange rates, charge lower fees);
- to avoid paying transfer taxes;
- to ensure anonymity since there may be minimal or no records maintained; or
- to avoid mandatory reporting of large transactions from financial institutions to governments.

Because IVTS provides security, anonymity, and versatility to the user, the systems can be also used for supplying resources for doing illegal activities. Following the September 11, 2001 attacks on the United States, IVTS have come under increased scrutiny and regulation in many countries as a result of pressure from the United States.

== See also ==
- Correspondent account
- Financial Action Task Force
- FATF blacklist
- Hawala
- Hundi
- Remittance
- Value transfer system
- Local exchange trading system
