= Wire transfer =

Method of electronic funds transfer

Wire transfer, bank transfer, or credit transfer, is a method of electronic funds transfer from one person or entity to another. A wire transfer can be made from one bank account to another bank account, or through a transfer of cash at a cash office.

Different wire transfer systems and operators provide a variety of options relative to the immediacy and finality of settlement and the cost, value, and volume of transactions. Central bank wire transfer systems, such as the Federal Reserve's Fedwire system in the United States, are more likely to be real-time gross settlement (RTGS) systems, as they provide the quickest availability of funds.

This is because RTGS systems, such as Fedwire, post each transaction individually and immediately to the electronic accounts of participating banks maintained by the central bank.

Other systems, such as the Clearing House Interbank Payments System (CHIPS), provide net settlement on a periodic basis. More immediate settlement systems tend to process higher monetary value time-critical transactions, have higher transaction costs, and have a smaller volume of payments. A faster settlement process allows less time for currency fluctuations while money is in transit.

== History ==
The first widely used service for wire transfers was launched by Western Union in 1872 on its existing telegraph network. Once a sender had paid money to one telegraph office, the operator could transmit a message and "wire" the money to another office, using passwords and code books to authorize the release of the funds to a recipient at that location. By 1877 the service was used to transfer almost $2.5 million each year. Because the earliest wire transfers were using telegraph networks, it was termed telegraphic transfer and this name is still used in some countries.

== Process ==
A bank wire transfer is effected as follows:

1. The entity wishing to do a transfer approaches a bank and gives the bank the order to transfer a certain amount of money. IBAN and BIC codes are typically given as well so the bank knows where the money needs to be sent.
2. The sending bank transmits a message, via a secure system (such as SWIFT or Fedwire), to the receiving bank, requesting that it effect payment according to the instructions given.
3. The message also includes settlement instructions. The actual transfer is not instantaneous: funds may take several hours or even days to move from the sender's account to the receiver's account.
4. Either the banks involved must hold a reciprocal account with each other, or the payment must be sent to a bank with such an account, a correspondent bank, for further benefit to the ultimate recipient.

Banks collect payment for the service from the sender as well as from the recipient. The sending bank typically collects a fee separate from the funds being transferred, while the receiving bank and intermediary banks through which the transfer travels deduct fees from the money being transferred so that the recipient receives less than what the sender sent.

For international wire transfers, additional information may be required, such as the recipient’s full name, physical address, bank name and address, bank account number and type, bank routing number, and the bank's SWIFT or IBAN code. The fees and processing times can vary depending on the service provider and the destination country.

== Regulation and price ==
=== In general ===
Banks may charge fees for wire transfers. The exact fees vary widely depending on the type of payment and the type of bank accounts involved. In some jurisdictions the fees may be regulated or capped.

=== European Union ===
Since 2009 the European Union Regulation No 924/2009 controls cross-border payments in the European Union. In the new regulation Article 1 (q.v., Ref.4) states that an IBAN/BIC transfer within Single Euro Payments Area (SEPA) must not cost more than a national transfer, no matter which currency is used. The receiving bank can charge for exchanging to local currency. As of 2022, most European banks do not charge private customers for SEPA transfers, apart from possible exchange fees. For business accounts, fees may be charged, but usually less than 40 cents.

Prior to this, in 2002 the European Union relegated the regulation of fees a bank may charge for payments in euro between EU member states down to the domestic level, resulting in very low or no fees for electronic transfers within the Eurozone. In 2005, Iceland, Liechtenstein, and Norway joined the EU regulation on electronic transfers. However, this regulation was superseded by the Single Euro Payments Area (SEPA), consisting of 32 European countries.

=== United States ===
In the United States, domestic wire transfers are governed by Federal Regulation J and by Article 4A of the Uniform Commercial Code. US wire transfers can be costly. In 2016, among the 15 largest retail banks, the average fee for an outgoing domestic wire was $25. Incoming domestic wire fees were about evenly split between $0 (free) and $15.

=== Australia ===
In Australia, money transfers are primarily regulated by the Australian Securities & Investments Commission, there is sometimes further regulation by the Australian Transaction Reports and Analysis Centre in industries where money laundering or terrorism financing are a risk; such as money remittance services. Domestic transfers in Australia are generally free to consumers. International transfers can be costly, and banks will often charge a fee between $0 (free) and $30, and an FX margin (the difference between the interbank rate, and the rate that you are charged). Cheaper alternatives to the banks are available from foreign exchange brokers, who usually charge a lower fee and/or margin.

== Security ==
With bank-to-bank wire transfer, each account holder must have a proven identity. Unlike credit card payments, wire transfers can generally not be recalled (though recalls are possible in some cases and jurisdictions). Information contained in wires is transmitted securely through encrypted communications methods.

Wire transfers done through cash offices are essentially anonymous and are designed for transfer between persons who trust each other. It is unsafe to send money by wire to an unknown person to collect at a cash office; the receiver of the money may, after collecting it, not provide whatever goods or services they promised in return for the payment, but instead simply disappear. This scam has been used often, especially in the so-called 419 scams which often nominate Western Union for collection.

International transfers involving the United States are subject to monitoring by the Office of Foreign Assets Control (OFAC), which monitors information provided in the text of the wire and then decides whether, according to the US Government's federal regulations and political positions, money is being transferred to terrorist groups, or countries or entities under sanction by the United States government. If a financial institution suspects that funds are being sent from or to one of these entities, it must block the transfer and freeze the funds.

SWIFT wire transfers are not completely free of vulnerabilities. Every intermediary bank that handles a wire transaction can take a fee directly out of the wire payload (the assets being transferred) without the account holder's knowledge or consent. In many places, there is no legislation or technical means to protect customers from this practice. If bank S is the sending bank (or brokerage), and bank R is the receiving bank (or brokerage), and banks I1, I2 and I3 are intermediary banks, the client may have a contract only with bank S and/or R, but banks I1, I2 and I3 can (and often do) take money from the wire without any direct arrangement with the client. Clients are sometimes taken by surprise when less money arrives at bank R. Contrast this with cheques, where the amount transferred is guaranteed in full, and fees (if there are any) can be charged only at endpoint banks.

The European Union offers some partial protection from this practice by prohibiting European intermediary banks from taking a fee out of the amount being transferred, even for transatlantic transfers. However, it is still common practice for a European brokerage firm to state that they charge no transfer fee, and then contact their bank to take an unpublished fee from the amount transferred as a means to compensate their bank with their clients' assets.

== Methods ==
=== Retail money transfers ===
One of the largest companies that offer wire transfer is Western Union, which allows individuals to transfer or receive money without an account with Western Union or any financial institution. Concern and controversy about Western Union transfers have increased in recent years, because of the increased monitoring of money-laundering transactions, as well as concern about terrorist groups using the service, particularly in the wake of the September 11, 2001, attacks. Although Western Union keeps information about senders and receivers, some transactions can be done essentially anonymously, for the receiver is not always required to show identification.

Another option for consumers and businesses transferring money internationally is to use specialised brokerage houses for their international money transfer needs. Many of these specialised brokerage houses can transfer money at better exchange rates compared to banks, thus saving up to 4%. These providers can offer a range of currency exchange products like spot contracts, forward contracts and limit orders. However, not all such providers are regulated by appropriate government bodies. For example, in the UK, even though such companies are regulated by the Financial Conduct Authority, not all of them fall under FCA scrutiny. Other such regulators include the Australian Securities and Investments Commission (ASIC), the Financial Transactions Reports Analysis Centre of Canada (FINTRAC) in Canada, and the Hong Kong Customs and Excise Department.

=== International ===
Most international transfers are executed through SWIFT, a co-operative society founded in 1974 by seven international banks, which operate a global network to facilitate the transfer of financial messages. Using these messages, banks can exchange data for the transfer of funds between financial institutions. SWIFT's headquarters are in La Hulpe, on the outskirts of Brussels, Belgium.

SWIFT also acts as an international standards body for the creation and maintenance of financial-messaging standards. See SWIFT Standards.

Each financial institution is assigned an ISO 9362 code, also called a Bank Identifier Code (BIC) or SWIFT Code. These codes are generally eight characters long. For example: Deutsche Bank is an international bank with its head office in Frankfurt, Germany, the SWIFT Code for which is DEUTDEFF:

- DEUT identifies Deutsche Bank.
- DE is the country code for Germany.
- FF is the code for Frankfurt.

Using an extended code of 11 digits (if the receiving bank has assigned extended codes to branches or to processing areas) allows the payment to be directed to a specific office. For example: DEUTDEFF500 would direct the payment to an office of Deutsche Bank in Bad Homburg. SWIFT deviates slightly from the standard, though, by using position nine for a Logical Terminal ID, making its extended codes 12 digits long.

European banks making transfers within the European Union and within Switzerland also use the International Bank Account Number, or IBAN.

=== United States ===
Banks in the United States use SWIFT to send messages to notify banks in other countries that a payment has been made. Banks use the Fedwire system or CHIPS to actually effect the payment.

Domestic bank-to-bank wire transfers are conducted through Fedwire or CHIPS. Transmitting and receiving US banks are uniquely identified by their ABA routing transit number.

== Other electronic transfers ==
Other forms of electronic transfers include, for example, electronic funds transfer system (EFTS). This is the system used to transfer money from a bank account to another party. It is also the system used in some payments made via a bank's online bill payment service. These transfers are made using a bank routing number and the account number at that institution. EFTS transfers differ from wire transfers in important legal ways. An EFTS payment is essentially an electronic personal check, whereas a wire transfer is more like an electronic cashier's check.

EFTS transfers are often called "ACH transfers", because they take place through Automated Clearing Houses.

== See also ==
- ACH Network
- ATM card
- Bank fraud
- Electronic bill payment
- E-commerce payment system
- Money transmitter
- Payment card industry
- Payment gateway
- Payment system
- Payment Services Directive
- Payments as a service
- Prepayment for service
