= Trade Services Utility =

The SWIFTNet Trade Services Utility (TSU) is a banking initiative provided by the Society for Worldwide Interbank Financial Telecommunication (SWIFT).

The basic concept for the TSU is a matching system for trade documents which is designed to allow banks to provide funding at various stages throughout the physical supply chain. This can be used for letter of credit business or open account transactions.

The service is available between banks and is designed to allow banks to integrate more effectively with their corporate customers and their suppliers. The TSU provides a service that will allow the financial supply chain to mirror the physical supply chain.

== History ==
SWIFTNet Trade Services Utility became commercially available on April 2nd, 2007.
