= Single Euro Payments Area =

System for money transfers within the European Union area

- Eurozone Non-Eurozone European Union member states Other member states of the European Economic Area, and Switzerland SEPA member states negotiating European Union accession Microstates participating in SEPA United Kingdom (remaining in SEPA after Brexit)
- Type: Uniform pan-European financial transactions framework
- Participants: 41 polities: Albania; Andorra; Austria; Belgium; Bulgaria; Croatia; Cyprus; Czech Republic; Denmark; Estonia; Finland; France; Germany; Greece; Hungary; Iceland; Ireland; Italy; Latvia; Liechtenstein; Lithuania; Luxembourg; Malta; Moldova; Monaco; Montenegro; Netherlands; North Macedonia; Norway; Poland; Portugal; Romania; San Marino; Serbia; Slovakia; Slovenia; Spain; Sweden; Switzerland; United Kingdom; Vatican City

Leaders
  - Public regulator: Euro Retail Payments Board
  - Private regulator: European Payments Council
- Currency: Euro (€)

The Single Euro Payments Area (SEPA) is a payment-integration system of the European Union that makes cross-border bank transfers in euros as fast, cheap, and simple as domestic payments. It allows individuals and businesses to make cashless euro transfers to any account within the zone using a single bank account and an International Bank Account Number, under the same basic conditions and charges as transfers within their own country.

Standard SEPA credit transfers settle within one business day, while the instant scheme (SCT Inst) processes payments in less than ten seconds around the clock. As of 2025, SEPA covers 41 countries: the 27 member states of the European Union, the four EFTA states (Iceland, Liechtenstein, Norway, and Switzerland), the United Kingdom, four European microstates (Andorra, Monaco, San Marino, and Vatican City), and five EU candidate countries (Albania, Moldova, Montenegro, North Macedonia, and Serbia).

SEPA covers predominantly standard bank transfers. Payment methods that include additional proprietary features, such as specific mobile payments or smart card payment systems, are not directly covered. However, the instant SEPA payment scheme facilitates digital retail payment services directly from smart devices.

== Goals ==
The aim of SEPA as stated in 2008 was to improve the efficiency of cross-border payments and turn the previously fragmented national markets for euro payments into a single domestic one. SEPA enables customers to make cashless euro payments to any account located anywhere in the area, using a single bank account and a single set of payment instruments. People who have a bank account in a eurozone country can use it to receive salaries and make payments throughout the zone, for example when taking a job in another member state.

The project includes the development of common financial instruments, standards, procedures, and infrastructure to enable economies of scale. As of 2007, it was estimated this could reduce the overall cost to the European economy of moving capital around the region by up to 2–3% of total GDP.

SEPA does not cover payments in currencies other than the euro. This means that domestic payments in SEPA countries not using the euro continue to use local systems, while cross-border transactions involving the eurozone rely predominantly on SEPA in euros.

The Nordic countries (other than Finland) do not use the euro and have no plans to adopt it. These four countries (Sweden, Denmark, Norway, and Iceland) started initiatives during 2017–2019 for simpler, faster, and cheaper cross-border payments between one another. However, the joint initiative (P27 Nordic Payments) was suspended in April 2023 after the consortium withdrew its clearing licence application.

== Schemes ==
The different functionalities provided by SEPA are divided into separate payment schemes.

=== SEPA Credit Transfer ===
SEPA Credit Transfer (SCT) allows for the transfer of funds from one bank account to another. SEPA clearing rules require that payments made before the cutoff point on a working day be credited to the recipient's account by the next working day. The scheme was introduced in January 2008. In February 2014 it replaced the national credit transfer schemes, and later made the use of International Bank Account Number mandatory for transfers.

=== SEPA Instant Credit Transfer ===
SEPA Instant Credit Transfer (SCT Inst), also called SEPA Instant Payment, provides for instant crediting of a payee, the delay being less than ten seconds, initially, with a maximum of twenty seconds in exceptional circumstances. This scheme was launched in November 2017, and was at that time operational for end customers in eight Eurozone countries. As of 2024, not all banks offer their customers instant transfers; however, in March 2024 the EU adopted the Instant Payments Regulation which requires all banks to offer instant transfers from January 2025 (incoming transfers) / October 2025 (outgoing transfers).

=== Direct debit ===
Direct debit functionality is provided by two separate schemes. The basic scheme, Core SDD, is primarily targeted at consumers and was launched on 2 November 2009. Banks offering SEPA payments are obliged to participate in this scheme. A second scheme, B2B SDD, is targeted towards business users. Banks offering SEPA payments are not obliged to participate in this scheme (participation is optional). Among the differences with respect to Core SDD:

- It requires a mandate to be submitted to the bank by both the creditor and debtor.
- It does not allow the debtor to request a refund from its bank after its account has been debited.

== Coverage ==
SEPA consists of 41 countries:

- The 27 member states of the European Union, including
  - the 21 states that are in the Eurozone:
    - Austria, Belgium, Bulgaria, Croatia, Cyprus, Estonia, Finland, France, Germany, Greece, Ireland, Italy, Latvia, Lithuania, Luxembourg, Malta, the Netherlands, Portugal, Slovakia, Slovenia, Spain
  - the 6 states that are not in the Eurozone:
    - the Czech Republic, Denmark, Hungary, Poland, Romania, Sweden.
- The four member states of the European Free Trade Association
  - the three states having signed the European Economic Area agreement:
    - Iceland, Liechtenstein, Norway.
  - the one EFTA member that has not joined the EEA, but instead has a series of sectoral agreements with the EU:
    - Switzerland.
- Four microstates which have monetary agreements with the EU:
  - Andorra, Monaco, San Marino, and Vatican City.
- Five countries currently in the negotiating phase of the European Union Accession:
  - Albania, Montenegro, Moldova, North Macedonia, Serbia.
- The United Kingdom, which has withdrawn from the European Union but participates in SEPA payment schemes, albeit with the requirement of the BIC (Swift) number.
  - Gibraltar and the Crown dependencies (Guernsey, Jersey and the Isle of Man) are part of SEPA.

All parts of a country are normally part of SEPA. However, the following countries have special territories which are not part of SEPA:

- Cyprus: Northern Cyprus is excluded.
- Denmark: the Faroe Islands and Greenland are excluded.
- France: the French Southern and Antarctic Lands, French Polynesia, New Caledonia and Wallis and Futuna are excluded. Nevertheless, the latter three are part of SEPA COM Pacifique.
- Netherlands: Aruba, the Caribbean Netherlands, Curaçao and Sint Maarten are excluded.
- Norway: Svalbard and Jan Mayen are excluded.
- Serbia: Autonomous Province of Kosovo and Metohija is excluded.
- United Kingdom: British Overseas Territories are excluded, except for Gibraltar and the Crown dependencies.

Jurisdictions using the euro that are not in SEPA: Akrotiri and Dhekelia, French Southern and Antarctic Lands and Kosovo.

Jurisdictions in Europe not formally belonging to SEPA normally use SEPA schemes anyway for international euro payments, especially to or from the eurozone, with exceptions such as fees charged and BIC required.

== Enlargement ==
Several EU applicant states have expressed interest in applying to join SEPA.

=== Bosnia and Herzegovina ===
Bosnia and Herzegovina filed an application to join SEPA on 6 August 2026. In July 2026, the Parliament of the Federation of Bosnia and Herzegovina and the National Assembly of Republika Srpska passed legislation to align the country with SEPA regulations.

=== Georgia ===
The National Bank of Georgia applied to join SEPA on 20 September 2022. As of 2025 the National Bank of Georgia has been working with representatives of several EU central banks, including National Bank of Poland and National Bank of Slovakia in order to further the SEPA accession process. The accession of Georgia to the European Union has largely stalled due to the 2024–2026 Georgian political crisis and democratic backsliding which has also stalled Georgia’s accession into SEPA.

=== Kosovo ===
Kosovo intends to apply after passing necessary legislation. Kosovo's chief negotiator for EU accession Jeton Zulfaj stated that several laws needed to be passed by the Assembly of Kosovo in order to fulfill SEPA requirements, including the Law on Payment Services and Law on Preventing Money Laundering and Combating the Financing of Terrorism. As of July 2026 only the Law on Payment Services has been passed. In late September 2026 the Kosovar government submitted the draft law amending Law on Preventing Money Laundering to the Assembly of Kosovo. According to the Central Bank of Kosovo, this law is the last legislative hurdle before the Central Bank can adopt two final regulations required to formally submit an application to join SEPA. On October 17 2026 the Assembly of Kosovo passed the necessary amendments to the Law on the Prevention of Money Laundering and Combating the Financing of Terrorism. The Central Bank of Kosovo officially submitted Kosovo’s application for inclusion in the geographical scope of SEPA on 6 November 2026.

=== Turkey ===
In February 2026, Turkey was offered membership in SEPA by European Commissioner for Enlargement Marta Kos. In July 2026, Turkish Minister of Foreign Affairs Hakan Fidan stated Turkey was interested in joining SEPA and that related financial institutions are working on the issue, and Turkish Minister of Finance Mehmet Şimşek stated that Turkey has sent a letter of intent for joining SEPA.

=== Ukraine ===
Ukraine as of December 2025 is working on legislation to align Ukrainian law with SEPA standards. On 10 November 2026 the Verkhovna Rada passed a draft law which brings legislative changes necessary to comply with SEPA standards. The Cabinet of Ministers of Ukraine is planning to file an application for SEPA membership by the end of 2027.

== Charges ==
SEPA ensures that euro payments are credited within a specified timeframe, and prohibits banks from making deductions from the transferred amount, a principle established by regulation in 2001. Banks and payment institutions still have the option of charging a credit-transfer fee of their choice for euro transfers if it is charged uniformly to all EEA participants, banks or payment institutions, domestic or foreign. This is relevant for countries which do not use the euro, where domestic transfers in euros by consumers are uncommon, and inflated fees for euro transfers might otherwise be charged. Sweden and Denmark have legislated that euro transfers shall be charged the same as transfers in their national currency, which has the effect of giving free euro ATM withdrawals, but charges for ATM withdrawals in other currencies used in the EU.

In regulation (EC) 924/2009 (the Cross-border Payments Regulation), the European Parliament mandated that charges in respect of cross-border payments in euros (of up to EUR 50,000) between EU member states shall be the same as the charges for corresponding payments within the member state. However, the EU Regulation does not apply to all SEPA countries; the most significant difference is the inclusion of Switzerland in SEPA but not the EU. The rule of the same price applies even if the transaction is sent as an international transaction instead of a SEPA transaction (common before 2008, or if any involved bank does not support SEPA transactions). Regulation 924/2009 does not regulate charges for currency conversion so charges for non-euro transactions can still be applied (if not banned by national law).

== History ==
There were two milestones in the establishment of SEPA:

- Pan-European payment instruments for credit transfers began on 28 January 2008; direct debits and debit cards became available in November 2009.
- By the end of 2010, all former national payment infrastructures and payment processors were expected to be in full competition to increase efficiency through consolidation and economies of scale.

For direct debits, the first milestone was missed due to a delay in the implementation of enabling legislation (the Payment Services Directive or PSD) in the European Parliament. Direct debits became available in November 2009, which put time pressure on the second milestone.

The European Commission has established the legal foundation through the PSD. The commercial and technical frameworks for payment instruments were developed by the European Payments Council (EPC), made up of European banks. The EPC is committed to delivering three pan-European payment instruments:

- Credit transfers: SCT – SEPA Credit Transfer
- Direct debits: SDD – SEPA Direct Debit. Banks began offering this service on 2 November 2009.
- Cards: SEPA Cards Framework

To provide end-to-end automated direct payment processing for SEPA-clearing, the EPC committed to delivering technical validation subsets of ISO 20022. Whereas bank-to-bank messages (pacs) are mandatory for use, customer-to-bank payment initialization (PAIN) message types are not; however, they are strongly recommended. Because there is room for interpretation, it is expected that several PAIN specifications will be published in SEPA countries.

Businesses, merchants, consumers and governments are also interested in the development of SEPA. The European Associations of Corporate Treasurers (EACT), TWIST, the European Central Bank, the European Commission, the European Payments Council, the European Automated Clearing House Association (EACHA), payments processors and pan-European banking associations – European Banking Federation (EBF), European Association of Co-operative Banks (EACB) and the European Savings Banks Group (ESBG) – are playing an active role in defining the services which SEPA will deliver.

Since January 2008, banks have been switching customers to the new payment instruments. By 2010, the majority were expected to be on the SEPA framework. As a result, banks throughout the SEPA area (not just the Eurozone) need to invest in technology with the capacity to support SEPA payment instruments.

SEPA clearance is based on International Bank Account Numbers (IBAN). Domestic euro transactions are routed by IBAN; earlier national-designation schemes were abolished by February 2014 (with delays in some countries), providing uniform access to the new payment instruments. Since February 2016 Eurozone payment system users no longer require BIC sorting information for SEPA transactions; it is automatically derived from the IBAN for all banks in the SEPA area.

An instant 24/7/365 payment scheme named SCT Inst went live on 21 November 2017 allowing instant payment 24 hours a day and 365 days a year. The participating banks will handle the user interface and security, like for existing SEPA payments, e.g. web sites and mobile apps.

=== Key dates ===
1957	Treaty of Rome creates the European Community.
1992	Maastricht Treaty creates the euro.
1999	Introduction of the euro as an electronic currency, including introduction of the RTGS system TARGET for large-value transfers.
2000	Lisbon Strategy: Meeting creates European Financial Services Action Plan.
2001	EC Regulation 2560/2001 harmonises fees for cross-border and domestic euro transactions.
2002	Introduction of Euro banknotes and coins.
2003	First Pan-European Automated Clearing House (PE-ACH) goes live; EC Regulation 2560/2001 comes into force for transactions up to €12,500.
2006	EC Regulation 2560/2001 increases ceiling on same-price euro transactions to €50,000.
2008	SEPA pan-European payment instruments become operational (parallel to domestic instruments) on 28 January
2009	Payment Services Directive (PSD) enacted in national laws by November.
2010	SEPA payments become dominant form of electronic payments.
2011	SEPA payments replace national payments in the Eurozone.
2014	1 August: Single Euro Payments Area (SEPA) becomes fully operational in all Eurozone countries.
2016	Since 31 October 2016, payment service providers (PSPs) in non-euro countries are only able to collect euro-denominated payments using SEPA procedures. Non-euro schemes, such as the UK's Direct Debit, continue without change.
2017	Since 21 November 2017, instant SEPA payments of up to 15,000 euros within 10 seconds become available (optional participation for PSPs).
2019	On 1 March 2019 Andorra and Vatican City join SEPA.
2021	On 1 January 2021 the United Kingdom leaves the EU but remains in SEPA payment schemes, subject to different rules.
2023	On 8 November 2023, the European Commission adopted a new Growth Plan for the Western Balkans, with the aim of bringing them closer to the EU through offering some of the benefits of EU membership to the region in advance of accession. One of the priority actions is access to the Single Euro Payments Area (SEPA).
2024	On 30 January 2024, the National Bank of Moldova submitted an application for membership in SEPA. Moldova's National Bank Governor expected the application and evaluation stage to take a year.
2024	On 12 June 2024, the National Bank of Albania signs the official application for membership in SEPA.
2024	On 17 June 2024, the National Bank of Serbia publishes the draft version of the decision for accessing SEPA.
2024	On 1 July 2024, the Central Bank of Montenegro submitted an application for membership in SEPA.
2024	On 11 July 2024, the National Bank of North Macedonia submitted an application for membership in SEPA.
2024	On 21 November 2024, the European Commission welcomed Albania and Montenegro into SEPA.
2025	On 6 March 2025, the European Commission welcomed Moldova and North Macedonia into SEPA.
2025	On 22 May 2025, the European Commission welcomed Serbia into SEPA.
2025	On 9 October 2025, Eurozone member states were required to implement verification of payee (VoP) for instant payments.
2026	On 6 August 2026, the Central Bank of Bosnia and Herzegovina submitted an application for membership in SEPA.
2026	On 6 November 2026, the Central Bank of Kosovo submitted an application for membership in SEPA.

=== Uptake ===
As of August 2014, 99.4% of credit transfers, 99.9% of direct debit, and 79.2% of card payments have been migrated to SEPA in the euro area.

The official progress report was published in March 2013.

In October 2010, the European Central Bank published its seventh progress report on SEPA. The European Central Bank regards SEPA as an essential element to advance the usability and maturity of the euro.

== See also ==
- Creditor Reference
- European Payments Union – Former European organization
- European Union law
- Digital euro – Central bank digital currency project
- FedNow – US Federal Reserve payment service
- Giro (banking) – Payment transfer from one bank account to another bank account and initiated by the payer
- Wero – European mobile payment service
- Instrument in Support of Trade Exchanges – SPV to facilitate non-dollar trade with Iran
- ISO 20022 – Standard for electronic data interchange between financial institutions
- Payment Services Directive – EU Directive
- Society for Worldwide Interbank Financial Telecommunication – Financial telecommunication network
- SPFS – Russian financial transfer system
