= SPFS =

Russian financial transfer system

SPFS СПФС
- Company type: Payment system
- Founded: 2014; 12 years ago
- Headquarters: Moscow, Russia
- Parent: Bank of Russia
- Website: www.cbr.ru/psystem/fin_msg_transfer_system/

The System for Transfer of Financial Messages (Russian: Система передачи финансовых сообщений, romanized: Sistema peredachi finansovykh soobscheniy), abbreviated SPFS (Russian: СПФС), is a Russian equivalent of the SWIFT financial transfer system, developed by the Central Bank of Russia. The system has been in development since 2014, when the United States government threatened to disconnect the Russian Federation from the SWIFT system. Since June 2024 the system is banned by the European Council for EU banks outside Russia, and in an alert issued in November 2024 the US OFAC warned that institutions that join the system after the issuance of this alert will be subject to aggressive targeting.

== History ==
The first transaction on the SPFS network involving a non-bank enterprise was executed in December 2017. In March 2018, over 400 institutions (mostly banks) were part of the network.

Compared to SWIFT, the system initially faced a number of challenges, especially higher transaction costs though in March 2018 transaction fee was radically reduced to 0,80–1,00 ₽ (0.012–0.015 $) per transaction. As of 2018 the system worked within the Russian Federation though there were plans to integrate the network with the China-based Cross-Border Inter-Bank Payments System.

The Russian Government was also in talks to expand SPFS to developing countries such as Turkey and Iran. As of 2018, owing to its limitations, the SPFS system was seen as a last resort, rather than as a full replacement for the SWIFT network. Since 2019 many agreements have been reached to link SPFS to other countries' payment systems in China, India, Iran, as well as the countries inside the EAEU who are planning to use SPFS directly.

At the end of 2020, there were 23 foreign banks connected to the SPFS from Armenia, Belarus, Germany, Kazakhstan, Kyrgyzstan and Switzerland.

On March 17, 2022, Anatoly Aksakov, Chairman of the State Duma Committee on the Financial Market, announced that the Bank of Russia and the People's Bank of China were working on connecting the Russian and Chinese financial messaging systems. He also pointed to the beginning of the development of information transfer schemes using blockchains, including the digital ruble and the digital yuan.

On March 31, 2022, The Economic Times published information that the Indian government has offered Russia a new transaction system with the transfer of trade to the ruble and SPFS, which will work through the Reserve Bank of India and Russia's Vnesheconombank. According to the same data, the system will be put into operation within a week.

In April 2022, Russian Central Bank governor announced that most Russian financial institutions and 52 foreign organizations from at least 12 countries were successfully integrated with the SPFS.

On January 16, 2024, First Deputy Chairman of the Russian Central Bank announced that in Q3 2023 four more countries were connected to SPFS bringing the total count to 20, along with 550 organizations of which 150 were from 16 foreign countries.

== Geo-economic impact ==
As summarized by academic Tim Beal, SPFS is among the responses to sanctions imposed by the United States viewed by commentators as contributing to dedollarization.

The US authorities consider SPFS as a system created to help diminish the effects of sanctions imposed on Russian entities and individuals. In an alert issued on November 21, 2024, they made clear that institutions that join the system after the issuance of this alert will be subject to aggressive targeting, and foreign financial institutions should also be cautious of their exposure to other institutions participating in SPFS, which could be helping Russia evade US sanctions.

== See also ==
- Cross-Border Inter-Bank Payments System (CIPS)
- Indian Financial System Code (IFSC)
- Fedwire
- Russian National Card Payment System
- Mir (payment system)
- Structured Financial Messaging System (SFMS)
- SWIFT ban against Russian banks
