= Sibos (conference) =

International financial conference

- Status: Active
- Genre: Conference
- Begins: 1978
- Frequency: Annually
- Organiser: SWIFT
- Website: sibos.com

Sibos (previously known as SWIFT International Banking Operations Seminar) is a global financial services event. It is organized by SWIFT for the financial industry and is held annually around the world in major cities. Sibos brings together business leaders, decision makers and topic experts from across the financial ecosystem. Industry leading speakers and conference sessions, partners, and multiple networking events occur at Sibos.

== History ==
The first Sibos was held in 1978 in Brussels and has since been held in multiple European cities such as Amsterdam, Copenhagen, Berlin, and Helsinki, as well as other cities (such as Boston and Toronto) in North America and Sydney in Australia. In recent years, it has also been held more regularly in Asia and Oceania like China, Japan, Singapore, UAE, Australia and others. The conference has an average annual turnout of over 7,000 participants from around the world representing the financial services industry. The highest turnout was at the 2019 conference held in London which had about 11,500 participants. The Sibos has been cancelled twice in its history, in 2001 and 2020.

== Purpose ==
People who work in financial markets around the world participate as attendees and exhibitors to discuss issues relevant to the financial industry. Topics vary by year, but remain relevant to the current landscape of the global financial ecosystem in the areas of payments, securities, risk management, innovation, and cash management and trade.

== List ==
Year	Location	Country/Territory	Region	Dates	Notes
1978	Brussels	Belgium	Europe		Five years after its foundation, SWIFT organises the first “SIBOS” with 300 participants to maintain contact with its growing user base.
1979	Amsterdam	Netherlands	Europe		
1980	Copenhagen	Denmark	Europe		
1981	Düsseldorf	Germany	Europe		
1982	Washington, D.C.	United States	North America		The first Sibos outside of Europe
1983	Montreux	Switzerland	Europe		
1984	Barcelona	Spain	Europe		
1985	Brighton	United Kingdom	Europe		
1986	Nice	France	Europe		
1987	Montreal	Canada	North America		
1988	Vienna	Austria	Europe		
1989	Stockholm	Sweden	Europe		
1990	Berlin	Germany	Europe		
1991	Hong Kong	Hong Kong	Asia		The first Sibos in Asia
1992	Brussels	Belgium	Europe		
1993	Geneva	Switzerland	Europe		
1994	Boston	United States	North America		
1995	Copenhagen	Denmark	Europe		
1996	Florence	Italy	Europe		
1997	Sydney	Australia	Oceania		
1998	Helsinki	Finland	Europe		
1999	Munich	Germany	Europe	13-17 September	
2000	San Francisco	United States	North America		
2001	~~Singapore~~	Singapore	Asia		Cancelled following the 11 September attacks
2002	Geneva	Switzerland	Europe		
2003	Singapore	Singapore	Asia		
2004	Atlanta	United States	North America		
2005	Copenhagen	Denmark	Europe		
2006	Sydney	Australia	Oceania		
2007	Boston	United States	North America		
2008	Vienna	Austria	Europe	15–19 September	
2009	Hong Kong	Hong Kong	Asia	14–18 September	
2010	Amsterdam	Netherlands	Europe	25–29 October	The largest Sibos to date with 8,900 delegates, now surpassed by London 2019
2011	Toronto	Canada	North America	19–23 September	The largest Sibos in the Americas to date with 7,600 delegates
2012	Osaka	Japan	Asia	29 October–1 November	The largest Sibos in Asia Pacific to date with 6,250 delegates
2013	Dubai	United Arab Emirates	Middle East	16–19 September	
2014	Boston	United States	North America	29 September–2 October	
2015	Singapore	Singapore	Asia	12–15 October	
2016	Geneva	Switzerland	Europe	26-29 September	8,300 delegates from 158 countries
2017	Toronto	Canada	North America	16 - 19 October	
2018	Sydney	Australia	Oceania	22 - 25 October	7,500 attendees
2019	London	United Kingdom	Europe	23 - 26 September	Largest attendance with 11,500 delegates
2020	~~Boston~~	United States	North America	5 - 8 October	Cancelled then replaced by a digital event due to Covid-19
2021	~~Singapore~~	Singapore	Asia	11 - 14 October	Replaced by a digital event due to Covid-19
2022	Amsterdam	Netherlands	Europe	10 - 13 October	
2023	Toronto	Canada	North America	18 - 21 September	
2024	Beijing	China	Asia	21 - 24 October	
2025	Frankfurt	Germany	Europe	29 September - 2 October	
2026	Miami	United States	North America	28 September - 1 October	
2027	Singapore	Singapore	Asia	11-14 October	
2028	Paris	France	Europe	TBA	Announced
2029	Dubai	United Arab Emirates	Middle East	TBA	Announced
