= Instrument in Support of Trade Exchanges =

SPV to facilitate non-dollar trade with Iran

INSTEX SAS
- Type: Société par actions simplifiée
- Industry: Clearing house
- Founded: 31 January 2019; 7 years ago
- Headquarters: Paris, France
- Key people: Per Fischer (managing director); Sir Simon McDonald (chairman of the supervisory board); Miguel Berger (member of the supervisory board); Maurice Gourdault-Montagne (member of the supervisory board)
- Owner: France; Germany; United Kingdom
- Website: instex-europe.com

The Instrument in Support of Trade Exchanges (INSTEX) was a European special-purpose vehicle (SPV) established on 31 January 2019 and liquidated in March 2023. Its stated mission was to facilitate non-USD and non-SWIFT transactions with Iran to avoid breaking U.S. sanctions.

== History ==
On 1 January 2019, the initial announcement of INSTEX by France, Germany and the UK specified that the SPV would be headquartered in Paris and headed by Per Fischer, who formerly had served as Head of Financial Institutions at Commerzbank between 2003 and 2014.

In Iran, INSTEX was mirrored by the STFI (Special Trade and Finance Instrument), a similar SPV. STFI matches incoming and outgoing transactions in the same way. In effect, two Iranian entities pay each other, thus, no money crosses the Iranian border. Ali Khamenei, Leader of the Islamic Revolution, commented by likening the European financial mechanism for trade with Iran to a "bitter joke".

As of May 2019, the use of the SPV was limited to humanitarian purposes; such as the purchase of foods or medicines. INSTEX had been made available to all EU member states. On 11 February 2019, Russian deputy foreign minister Sergei Ryabkov stated that Russia would be interested in participating in INSTEX.

On 28 June 2019, France, Germany and the United Kingdom told a meeting of the JCPOA Joint Commission that INSTEX had been made operational and available to all EU member states. Federica Mogherini, High Representative of the European Union for Foreign Affairs and Security Policy stated that the purpose of INSTEX is to facilitate "legitimate trade" with Iran for any EU member and has been conceived to be open to non-EU countries.

In addition to the three founders, five other EU nations declared in a joint statement on 29 November 2019 that they will join the INSTEX mechanism for trade with Iran: Belgium, Denmark, Netherlands, Finland, and Sweden.

On 31 March 2020, over one year after the introduction of the platform, the first INSTEX transaction was concluded. It covered an import of medical equipment to combat the COVID-19 outbreak in Iran.

European countries stated in March 2023 they had decided to end INSTEX, through which only a single transaction had traded.

Academic Tim Beal described INSTEX as one among the responses to United States sanctions viewed by commentators as contributing to dedollarisation.

== See also ==
- Central Bank of Iran
- Iran–European Union relations
- Sanctions against Iran
- Sanctions against Russia
- Sanctions against Belarus
