= TIPANET =

TIPANET (Transferts Interbancaires de Paiement Automatisés) is an international payment system set up by the European cooperative banks. Its shareholders were Natexis Banques Populaires, France; Banca Popolare Commercio e Industria, Italy; Istituto Centrale delle Banche Popolari Italiane, Italy; Banco Popular de España, Spain; Crédit Professionnel, Belgium; The Cooperative Bank plc, United Kingdom; Österreichische Volksbanken AG, Austria; Genossenschaftliche FinanzGruppe, Germany (DZ Bank, formally DG Bank, GZ Bank and WGZ Bank), and Caisse Centrale Desjardins Quebec, Canada.

Its commercial counterpart and partner was UNICOPAY which failed in 2004 because it was overtaken by technological innovations such as the advent of SWIFT FileAct facilities and the creation of STEP2. The UNICOPAY principals were Caisse National de Crédit Agricole-Indosuez, France; Istituto Centrale delle Banche di Credito Cooperativo, Italy; KBC Bank (formerly CERA), Belgium; Lloyds TSB Bank, United Kingdom; OKOBANK, Finland; Rabobank, Netherlands; Raiffeisen Zentralbank, Austria and DG BANK, Germany.

Tipanet was founded in 1993 in order to manage, develop and run an efficient cross-border clearing system, in order to fulfill the "7 ECB objectives" issued around 2001 which were:

- Enhanced systems/services
- Priority for cross-border credit transfers
- Lower prices for cross-border credit transfers
- Settlement time should be comparable for domestic and cross-border payments
- Fees borne by the originator (OUR-payments)
- Access to cross-border retail payment systems
- Standard implementations

Each TIPANET member is free to seek out the most suitable international partners in the light of its business interests, its business traditions and its international trade relations, and these arrangements are made known to other members.

The local TIPANET agent collects payment instructions and converts them into the TIPANET message format, which complies with the SWIFT MT 102+ message structure. The TIPANET format handles credit transfers and money-cheques. After collecting the payment orders, the local agent compiles payment blocks and sends composite instructions to the respective foreign agents, who then convert the TIPANET message format into its domestic equivalent for local execution. The latest time for the exchange of files on any working day is 4 p.m. local time of the receiving bank for next-day execution. Therefore, the beneficiary’s account is normally credited two working days after the order is placed.

== PDF Reference Documents ==
European Central Bank Conference: TOWARDS A DOMESTIC PAYMENT INFRASTRUCTURE FOR THE EURO AREA Frankfurt am Rhein-Main 7 February 2001 Elektronische. Transaktions-und Zahlungssysteme http://www.ecb.int/events/pdf/conferences/04Malz_tipa.pdf

European Central Bank Blue Book, August 2007 http://www.ecb.int/pub/pdf/other/ecbbluebookea200708en.pdf

CPSS - Red Book - 2003 Payment systems in the euro area http://www.bis.org/publ/cpss53p04eu.pdf

EC Regulation 2560/2001: study of competition for cross-border payment services final report. Project n° markt/2004/11/f, prepared for the European Commission Internal Market and Services Directorate-General http://ec.europa.eu/internal_market/payments/docs/reg-2001-2560/competition_en.pdf
