= Value transfer system =

Long-distance banking system

A value transfer system refers to any system, mechanism, or network of people that receives money for the purpose of making the funds or an equivalent value payable to a third party in another geographic location, whether or not in the same form.

The average size of the payment is an indicator of the system's use. Specialised large-value transfer system have developed because of the large size and critical timing of some payments market participants require services and mechanisms that meet their need for reliability, security, accuracy and timeliness.

A value transfer system may fall into one or more of these groups:

- Retail value transfer systems:
  - Traditional retail value transfer systems, e.g. Bank transfer, Wire transfer, Post offices transfer service or specialist companies such as Western Union
  - Internet-only value transfer systems, e.g. Electronic money such as PayPal, eGold, Liberty Reserve
    - Cryptocurrencies: Bitcoin, Litecoin, Ethereum, etc.
- Institutional formal value transfer systems, e.g. SWIFT (International), domestic real-time gross settlement (RTGS) systems such as LVTS (Canada), Fedwire (USA), CHAPS (UK)
- Informal value transfer systems, e.g. hawala

== See also ==
- Digital currency
- Electronic funds transfer
- Correspondent account
- Payment system
- Community Exchange System
