= La Hulpe =

Municipality in Walloon Brabant province, Wallonia, Belgium

- Municipality
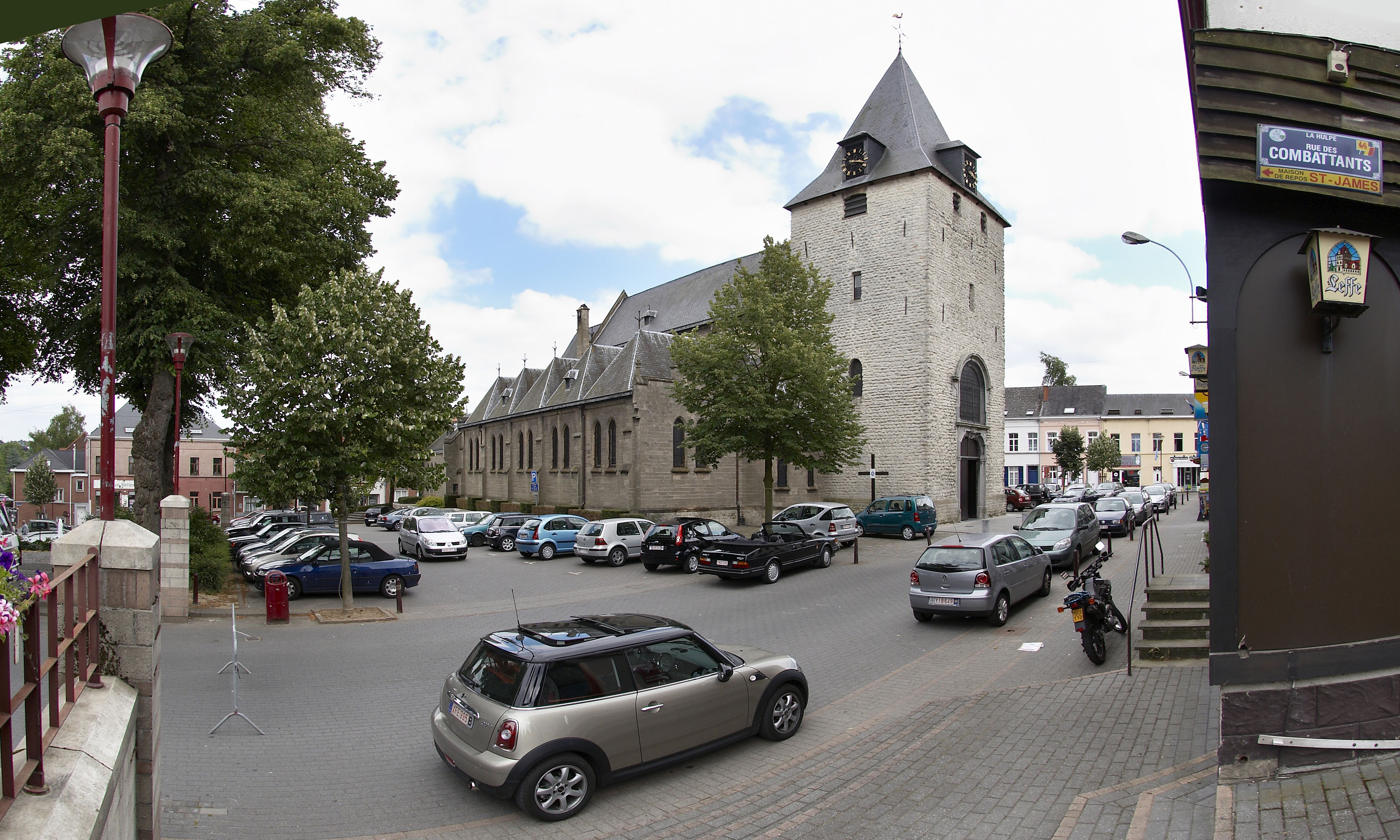

- Flag Coat of arms

- The municipality of La Hulpe in Walloon Brabant
- Interactive map of La Hulpe
- Location in Belgium
- Coordinates: 50°44′N 04°29′E
- Country: Belgium
- Community: French Community
- Region: Wallonia
- Province: Walloon Brabant
- Arrondissement: Nivelles

Government
  - Mayor: Christophe Dister
  - Governing party: Liste du Bourgmestre

Area
  - Total: 15.52 km^{2} (5.99 sq mi)

Population (2018-01-01)
  - Total: 7,320
  - Density: 472/km^{2} (1,220/sq mi)
- Postal codes: 1310
- NIS code: 25050
- Area codes: 02
- Website: www.lahulpe.be

La Hulpe (French pronunciation: [la ylp]; Dutch: Terhulpen, pronounced [tɛrˈɦʏlpə(n)]; Walloon: L’ Elpe) is a municipality of Wallonia in the Belgian province of Walloon Brabant, 20 km south-east of the centre of Brussels, but only about 3 km from the edge of the Brussels-Capital Region. On January 1, 2007, La Hulpe had a total population of 7,309. The total area is 15.60 km^{2}, including 3 km^{2} of the Sonian Forest; this gives a population density of 463 inhabitants per km^{2}.

La Hulpe still keeps two hamlets, Gaillemarde in the west and Malaise-Bakenbos in the east. The limits of the latter hamlet and of other parts of La Hulpe were modified when the linguistic border (between French and Dutch) was fixed in 1963.

The Society for Worldwide Interbank Financial Telecommunication's (SWIFT) headquarters are located in La Hulpe.

== History ==
The name of La Hulpe comes from the Celtic word helpe, "the silver river". The brooks that water La Hulpe form a string of ponds that is called today L'Argentine.

The site was already settled 10,000 years BC, as proved by an axe made of smooth flintstone found in Gaillemarde. The village was founded by the Duke of Brabant by clearing a hill separating the valleys of Argentine and Mazerine. La Hulpe was granted municipal rights by a charter signed by Henri I on 3 June 1320. It became a mairie, where lower and higher justice was exercised, and kept its status until 1792. The pillory standing near the church was demolished under the French rule; it was partially restored and can be seen in the town hall. From 1795 to 1814, La Hulpe was the seat of a court with jurisdiction over some ten neighbouring municipalities, in an area spreading from Overijse to Waterloo. After the independence of Belgium, La Hulpe lost its administrative and political functions and was incorporated into the canton of Wavre.

The church of La Hulpe was mentioned in a document dated 1226. It is shown on the oldest representation of La Hulpe, a Brussels tapestry from the Hunts of Maximilian suite kept in the Louvre Museum, showing a hunting scene emblematic of a month in Charles V's time. The church, except the tower and the central nave, were dramatically transformed, for the last time in 1906. The King Baudouin's Memorial was built behind the church, close to the oak commemorating the centenary of Belgium.

For three centuries, the economy of La Hulpe has been driven by paper-making industry, favoured by the closeness to Brussels and the availability of pure water. The first paper mill was set up on the Grand Etang (Big Pond). In 1664, King of Spain Philip II allowed the foundation of the "Imperial and Royal Paper Manufacture" in La Hulpe. Paper-making industry was suppressed in 1970.

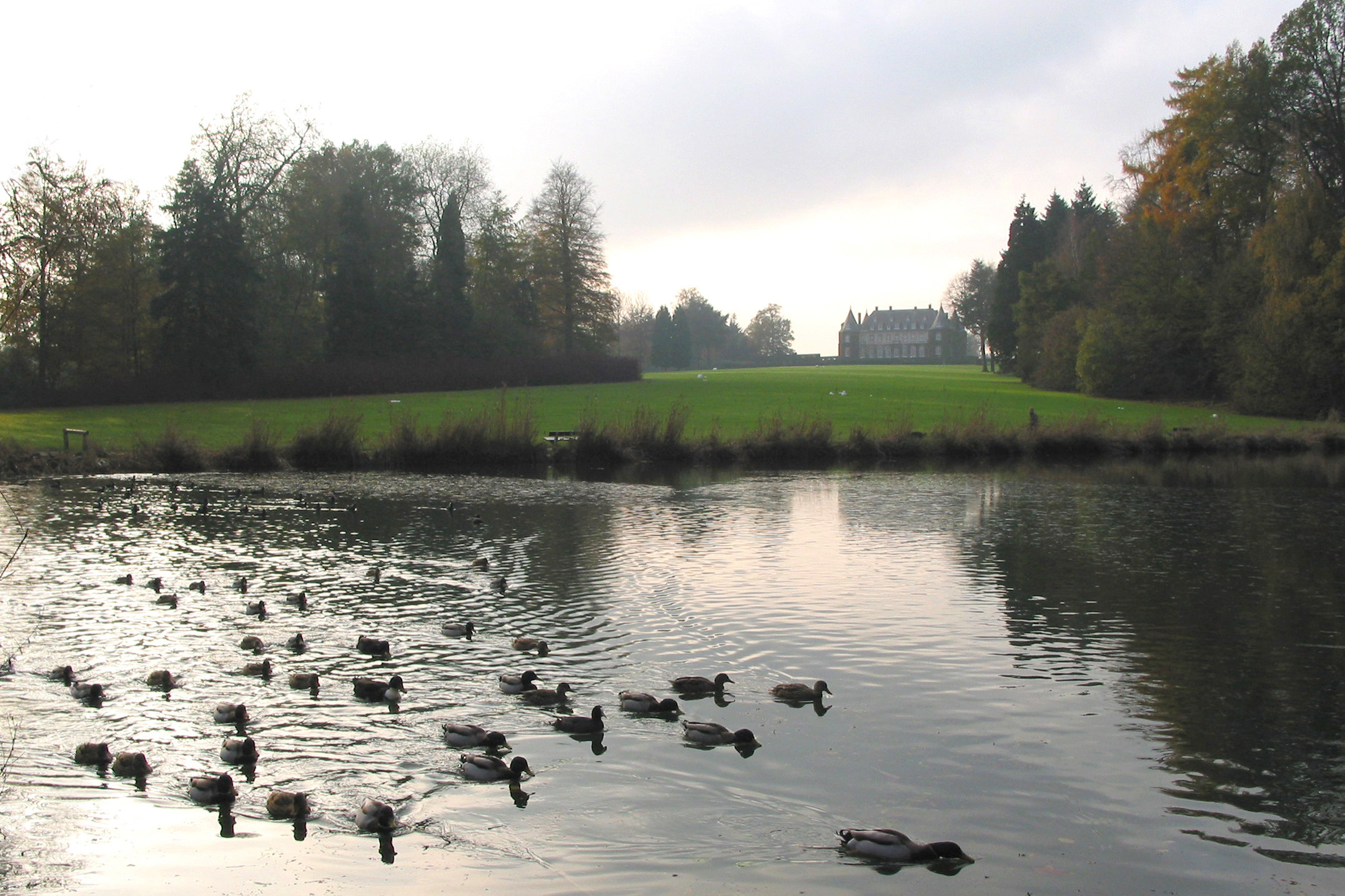
Domaine Solvay

The castle of La Hulpe, built in French style in 1842, was purchased by Count Ernest Solvay in 1893 and transferred to the Belgian state by his grandson, Ernest-John Solvay, in 1968. It is surrounded by a 227-ha domain with pastures, woods and ponds, known as Domaine Solvay. The castle and the domain are today managed by the Walloon Region and the Domaine Solvay association. The domain was protected for its aesthetic value by Royal Decree on 10 June 1963, then registered on the Walloon main heritage list in 1993, and eventually listed as a Natura 2000 site. In 1988, the movie Le Maître de musique (The Music Teacher) by Gérard Corbiau, starring José Van Dam, was made in the castle and park of La Hulpe.

The farm of the castle, built in 1833, is the seat of the Folon Foundation, inaugurated on 27 October 2000. Jean-Michel Folon (1934–2005) is mostly known as one of the most popular illustrators and poster designers of the second half of the 20th century. In the 1990s, Folon decided to create a foundation in the Solvay Domain, a place where he used to play when he was a young boy. He transferred to the foundation more than 300 of his works and organized their scenographic presentation in 15 rooms of the former farm. The foundation welcomed 80,000 visitors during its first year of existence.

== Royal La Hulpe Sporting Club ==
La Hulpe is home to Royal La Hulpe Sporting Club.

== Famous inhabitants ==
- Dr. Patrick Hunout, the founder of The Social Capital Foundation, has long lived in La Hulpe.
- Baron Pierre de Caters (1875–1944), The first Belgian aviator, lived in the estate known today as Domaine de Nysdam.
- Michael Klawans, basketball three-point sharpshooter. Nicknamed White Chocolate.

== Image gallery ==
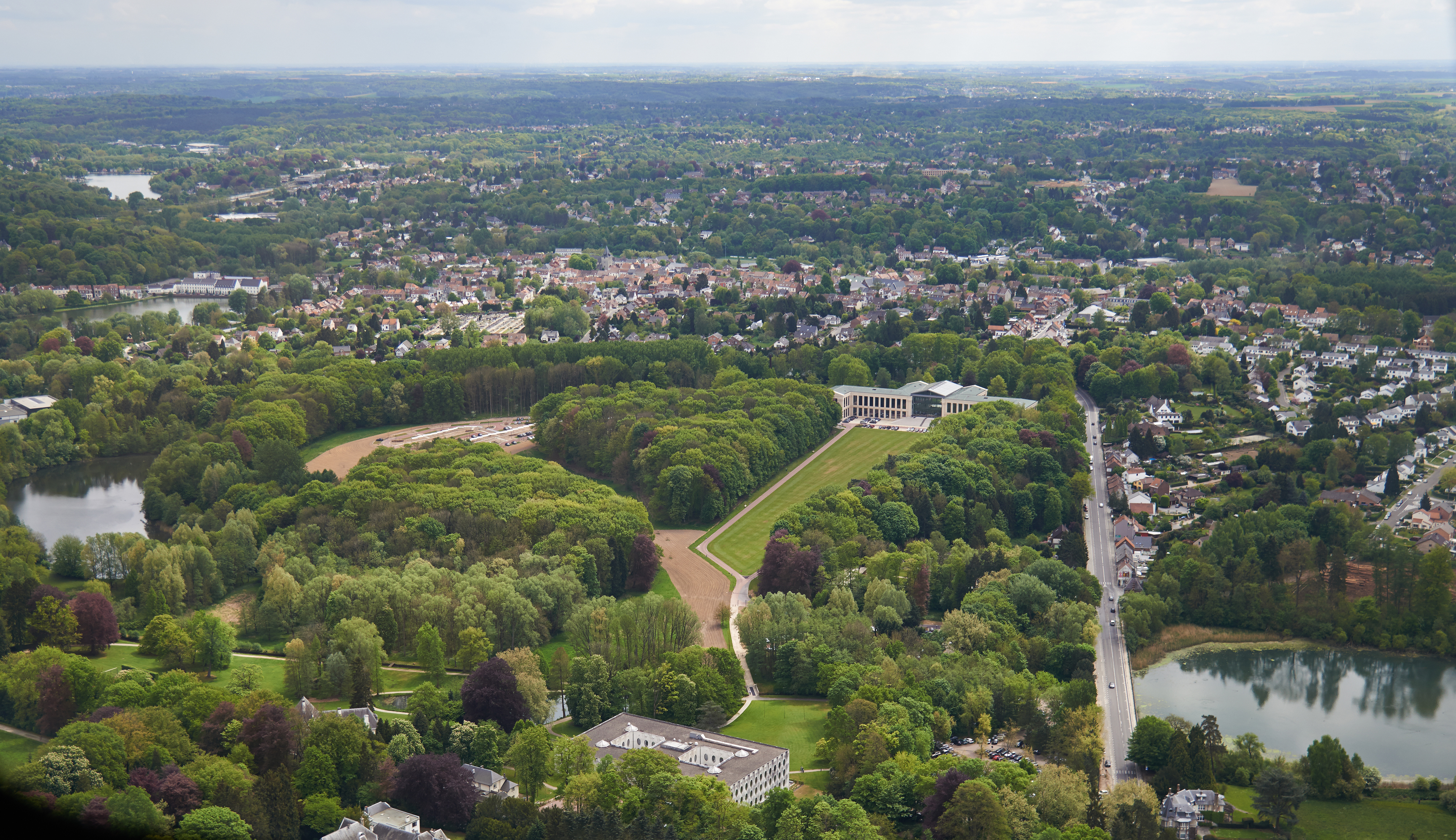
Aerial view of La Hulpe

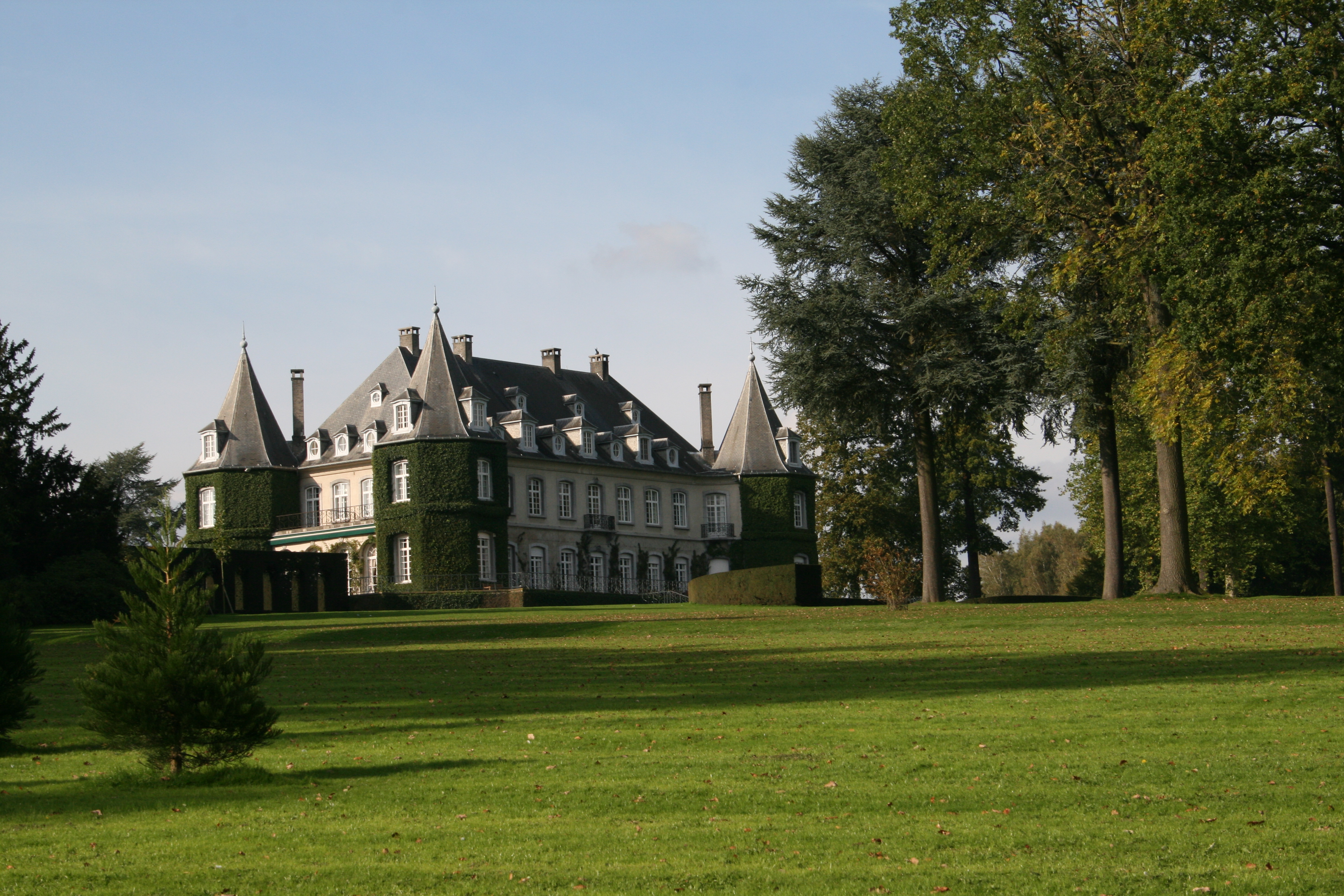
Château Solvay (1842)

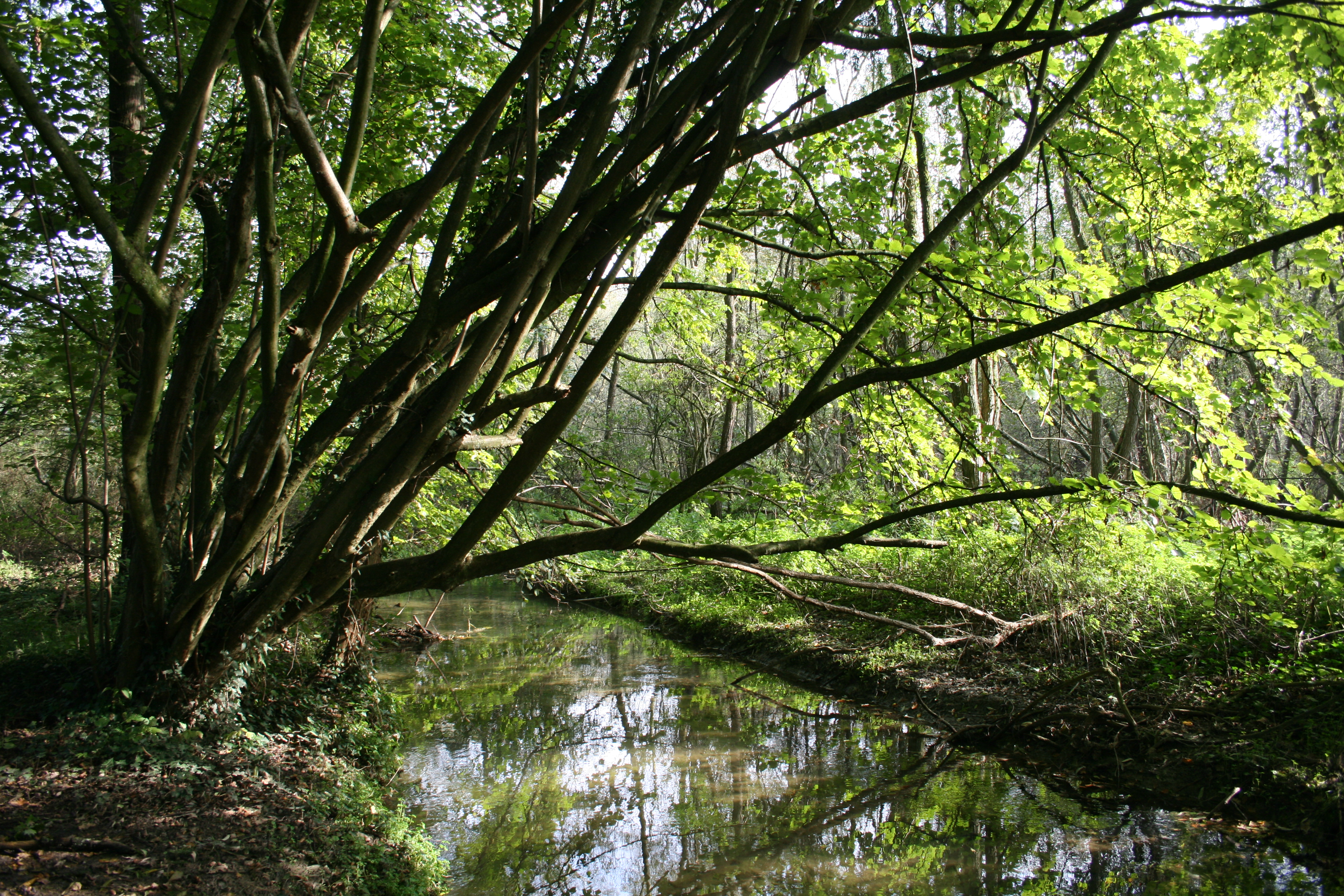
L'Argentine river
