= List of BRICS summit attendees =

This is a list of representative leaders of BRICS states at each BRICS Summit since the group's inception in 2009.

BRICS holds an annual summit, which each state or government leader attends. Each year the heads of government take turns assuming the presidency, whose job it is to set the agenda for, and host, the annual summit.

In 2023, Sergey Lavrov represented Russia instead of Vladimir Putin, and in 2024, Mauro Vieira represented Brazil instead of Luiz Inácio Lula da Silva.

Top leaders of BRICS countries

- President of Brazil
- President of Russia
- Prime Minister of India
- General Secretary of the Chinese Communist Party (Note: The de jure head of government of China is the Premier. The President of China is legally a ceremonial office, but the General Secretary of the Chinese Communist Party (de facto leader) has always held this office since 1993 except for the months of transition, and thus as the China's paramount leader and state representative.)
- President of South Africa
- President of Egypt
- Prime Minister of Ethiopia
- President of Iran (Note: The Supreme Leader is the top position in Iran, which is a theocratic Islamic republic. The armed forces, judiciary, state radio and television, and other key government organizations are subject to the supreme leader.)
- President of the United Arab Emirates
- President of Indonesia

Summit Year, Host	Country									
Summit Year, Host	Brazil	Russia	India	China	South Africa	Iran	Egypt	Ethiopia	United Arab Emirates	Indonesia
1st 2009; Russia	Luiz Inácio Lula da Silva	Dmitry Medvedev	Manmohan Singh	Hu Jintao	—N/a (N/A)	—N/a (N/A)	—N/a (N/A)	—N/a (N/A)	—N/a (N/A)	—N/a (N/A)
2nd 2010; Brazil	Luiz Inácio Lula da Silva	Dmitry Medvedev	Manmohan Singh	Hu Jintao	—N/a (N/A)	—N/a (N/A)	—N/a (N/A)	—N/a (N/A)	—N/a (N/A)	—N/a (N/A)
3rd 2011; China	Dilma Rousseff	Dmitry Medvedev	Manmohan Singh	Hu Jintao	Jacob Zuma	—N/a (N/A)	—N/a (N/A)	—N/a (N/A)	—N/a (N/A)	—N/a (N/A)
4th 2012; India	Dilma Rousseff	Dmitry Medvedev	Manmohan Singh	Hu Jintao	Jacob Zuma	—N/a (N/A)	—N/a (N/A)	—N/a (N/A)	—N/a (N/A)	—N/a (N/A)
5th 2013; South Africa	Dilma Rousseff	Vladimir Putin	Manmohan Singh	Xi Jinping	Jacob Zuma	—N/a (N/A)	—N/a (N/A)	—N/a (N/A)	—N/a (N/A)	—N/a (N/A)
6th 2014; Brazil	Dilma Rousseff	Vladimir Putin	Narendra Modi	Xi Jinping	Jacob Zuma	—N/a (N/A)	—N/a (N/A)	—N/a (N/A)	—N/a (N/A)	—N/a (N/A)
7th 2015; Russia	Dilma Rousseff	Vladimir Putin	Narendra Modi	Xi Jinping	Jacob Zuma	—N/a (N/A)	—N/a (N/A)	—N/a (N/A)	—N/a (N/A)	—N/a (N/A)
8th 2016; India	Michel Temer	Vladimir Putin	Narendra Modi	Xi Jinping	Jacob Zuma	—N/a (N/A)	—N/a (N/A)	—N/a (N/A)	—N/a (N/A)	—N/a (N/A)
9th 2017; China	Michel Temer	Vladimir Putin	Narendra Modi	Xi Jinping	Jacob Zuma	—N/a (N/A)	—N/a (N/A)	—N/a (N/A)	—N/a (N/A)	—N/a (N/A)
10th 2018; South Africa	Michel Temer	Vladimir Putin	Narendra Modi	Xi Jinping	Cyril Ramaphosa	—N/a (N/A)	—N/a (N/A)	—N/a (N/A)	—N/a (N/A)	—N/a (N/A)
11th 2019; Brazil	Jair Bolsonaro	Vladimir Putin	Narendra Modi	Xi Jinping	Cyril Ramaphosa	—N/a (N/A)	—N/a (N/A)	—N/a (N/A)	—N/a (N/A)	—N/a (N/A)
12th 2020; Russia (Note: Held virtually due to the COVID-19 pandemic.)	Jair Bolsonaro	Vladimir Putin	Narendra Modi	Xi Jinping	Cyril Ramaphosa	—N/a (N/A)	—N/a (N/A)	—N/a (N/A)	—N/a (N/A)	—N/a (N/A)
13th 2021; India	Jair Bolsonaro	Vladimir Putin	Narendra Modi	Xi Jinping	Cyril Ramaphosa	—N/a (N/A)	—N/a (N/A)	—N/a (N/A)	—N/a (N/A)	—N/a (N/A)
14th 2022; China	Jair Bolsonaro	Vladimir Putin	Narendra Modi	Xi Jinping	Cyril Ramaphosa	—N/a (N/A)	—N/a (N/A)	—N/a (N/A)	—N/a (N/A)	—N/a (N/A)
15th 2023; South Africa	Luiz Inácio Lula da Silva	Sergey Lavrov	Narendra Modi	Xi Jinping	Cyril Ramaphosa	—N/a (N/A)	—N/a (N/A)	—N/a (N/A)	—N/a (N/A)	—N/a (N/A)
16th 2024; Russia	Mauro Vieira	Vladimir Putin	Narendra Modi	Xi Jinping	Cyril Ramaphosa	Masoud Pezeshkian	Abdel Fattah el-Sisi	Abiy Ahmed	Mohammed bin Zayed Al Nahyan	—N/a (N/A)
17th 2025; Brazil	Luiz Inácio Lula da Silva	Sergey Lavrov	Narendra Modi	Li Qiang	Cyril Ramaphosa	Abbas Araghchi	Mostafa Madbouly	Abiy Ahmed	Khaled bin Mohamed Al Nahyan	Prabowo Subianto
18th 2026; India	Mauro Vieira	Vladimir Putin	Narendra Modi	Xi Jinping	Cyril Ramaphosa	Masoud Pezeshkian	Abdel Fattah el-Sisi	Abiy Ahmed	Khaled bin Mohamed Al Nahyan	Prabowo Subianto
