= BRICS =

Intergovernmental organization

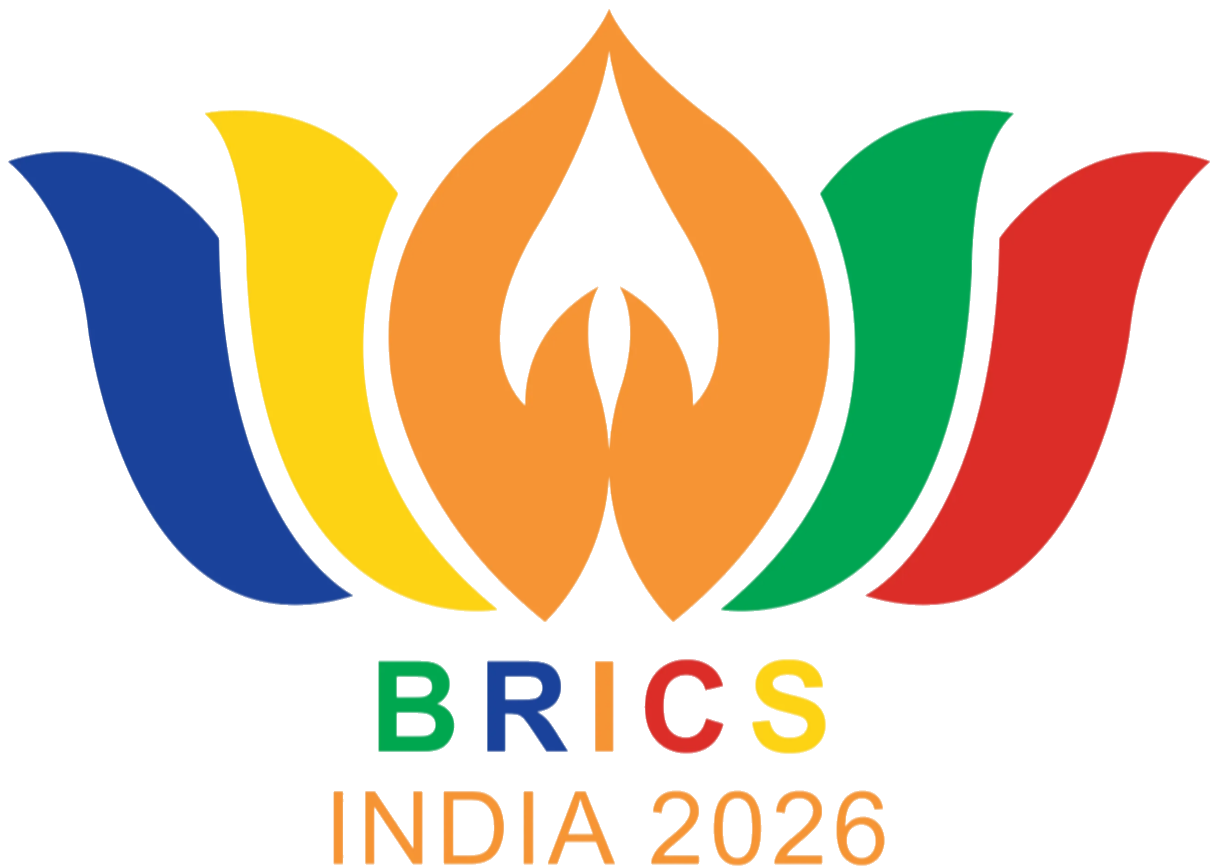
- Logo of BRICS during India's 2026 presidency

- BRICS member countries
- Named after: First five member states' initials in English
- Formation: 16 June 2009; 17 years ago
- Founded at: Yekaterinburg, Russia; (1st BRIC summit)
- Type: Intergovernmental organization
- Fields: International politics
- Members: Brazil; China; Egypt; Ethiopia; India; Indonesia; Iran; Russia; South Africa; United Arab Emirates
- Chairman (current): Narendra Modi, Prime Minister of India
- Website: www.brics2026.gov.in
- Formerly called: BRIC

BRICS is an international organization currently comprising ten countries: Brazil, Russia, India, China (the founder countries) and Egypt, Ethiopia, Indonesia, Iran, South Africa, the United Arab Emirates. Its purpose is to increase economic and geopolitical cooperation among major emerging economies while advocating for a multipolar global order with greater representation for developing nations.

Its conceptual origins were articulated by Russian foreign minister Yevgeny Primakov in 1998, and can be traced to informal forums and dialogue groups such as RIC (Russia, India, and China) and IBSA (India, Brazil, and South Africa). BRIC was originally a term coined by British economist Jim O'Neill, and later championed by his employer Goldman Sachs in 2001, to designate a group of emerging markets.

The bloc's inaugural summit was held in 2009 and featured the founding countries of Brazil, Russia, India, and China; they adopted the acronym BRIC and formed an informal diplomatic group where their governments could meet annually at formal summits and coordinate multilateral policies. South Africa joined the organization in September 2010, which was then renamed BRICS, and attended the third summit in 2011 as a full member. Iran, Egypt, Ethiopia, and the United Arab Emirates attended their first summit as member states in 2024 in Russia. Indonesia officially joined in early 2025, becoming the first Southeast Asian member. Saudi Arabia was invited at the Johannesburg summit and it is considered part of the organisation, but has not publicly confirmed its membership. (Note: Saudi Arabia's BRICS membership is disputed. Official BRICS sources list Saudi Arabia as a BRICS member while the country maintains ambiguity regarding its status.) The term BRICS+ has been informally used to reflect new membership since 2024.

Collectively, BRICS comprises more than a quarter of the global economy and nearly half the world's population. The group has established multilateral institutions and financial mechanisms, such as the New Development Bank, the BRICS Contingent Reserve Arrangement, and the BRICS PAY payment platform. It has also promoted de-dollarization initiatives to increase trade settlements in national currencies. Some commentators consider BRICS the alternative to the G7, and a major political force in the global international order. Others describe it as an incoherent affiliation of disparate countries centered on increasing anti-European and anti-American objectives. Nevertheless, all five original members, as well as Indonesia, are also part of the G20. BRICS has received both praise and criticism from numerous commentators and world leaders.

== History ==
=== Founding ===
Collective action in the political arena in the late 1990s was present before the economic rationale of BRICS. The idea of a multipolar group like BRICS can be traced back to Yevgeny Primakov during his term as Minister of Foreign Affairs of Russia. He reiterated the idea in New Delhi in 1998. The forums RIC (Russia, India, China) and IBSA (India, Brazil, South Africa) predated and played an important role in the creation of BRIC and subsequently BRICS.

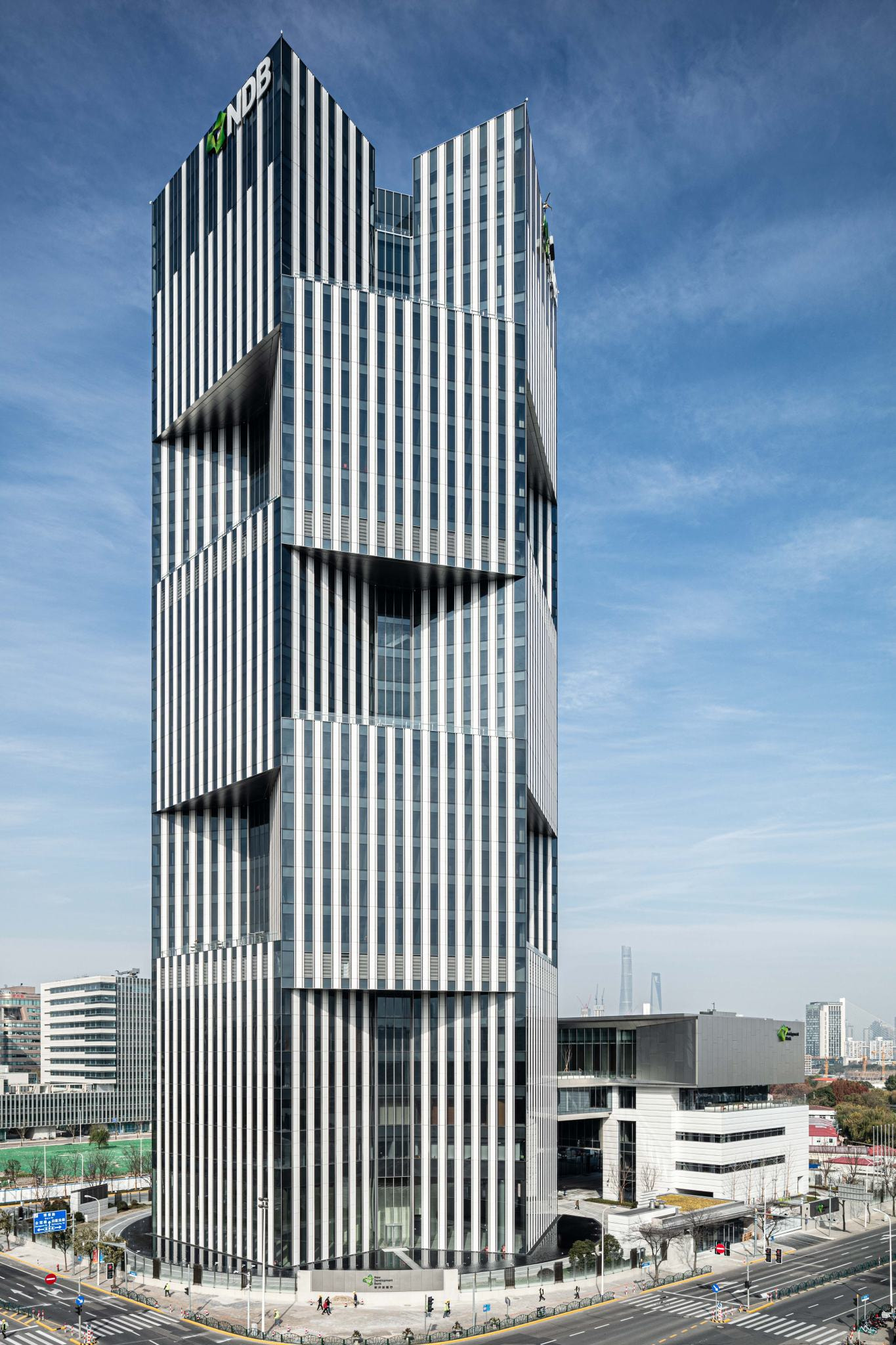
The New Development Bank, headquartered in Shanghai, China, is the premier institution of BRICS.

The term BRIC, as compared to the alternate term CRIB, was originally developed in the context of foreign investment strategies. It was introduced in the 2001 publication, Building Better Global Economic BRICs by Jim O'Neill, then head of global economics research at Goldman Sachs and later Chairman of Goldman Sachs Asset Management. O'Neill now regards the BRICS group as a failed project. In a 2021 article for Project Syndicate he wrote that the BRICS countries "have so far proven incapable of uniting as a meaningful global force" and felt in 2024 that "each year also brings further confirmation that the grouping serves no real purpose beyond generating symbolic gestures and lofty rhetoric".

The foreign ministers of the initial four BRIC states (Brazil, Russia, India, and China) met in New York City in September 2006 at the margins of the General Debate of the UN Assembly, beginning a series of high-level meetings. A full-scale diplomatic meeting was held in Yekaterinburg, Russia, on 16 June 2009.

The BRIC group's first formal summit, also held in Yekaterinburg, commenced on 16 June 2009, with Luiz Inácio Lula da Silva, Dmitry Medvedev, Manmohan Singh, and Hu Jintao, the respective leaders of Brazil, Russia, India, and China, all attending. The summit's focus was on improving the global economic situation and reforming financial institutions amid the Great Recession. There was also discussion of how the four countries could better cooperate in the future, and ways developing countries, such as three-fourths of the BRIC members, could become more involved in global affairs.

In the aftermath of the 2009 Yekaterinburg summit, the BRIC nations announced the need for a new global reserve currency, which would have to be "diverse, stable and predictable". Although their statement did not directly criticize the perceived dominance of the US dollar (as Russia had in the past) it did spark a fall in the value of the dollar against other major currencies.

=== 2010 expansion ===
In 2010, South Africa began efforts to join BRIC, and the process for its formal admission began in August of that year. South Africa officially became a member nation on 24 December 2010 after being formally invited by China, and was subsequently accepted by other BRIC countries. The group was renamed BRICS to represent the addition of South Africa to the original four BRIC members. At the third BRICS summit in 2011 in Sanya, China, South African president Jacob Zuma represented the country as a full member for the first time.

=== New Development Bank ===
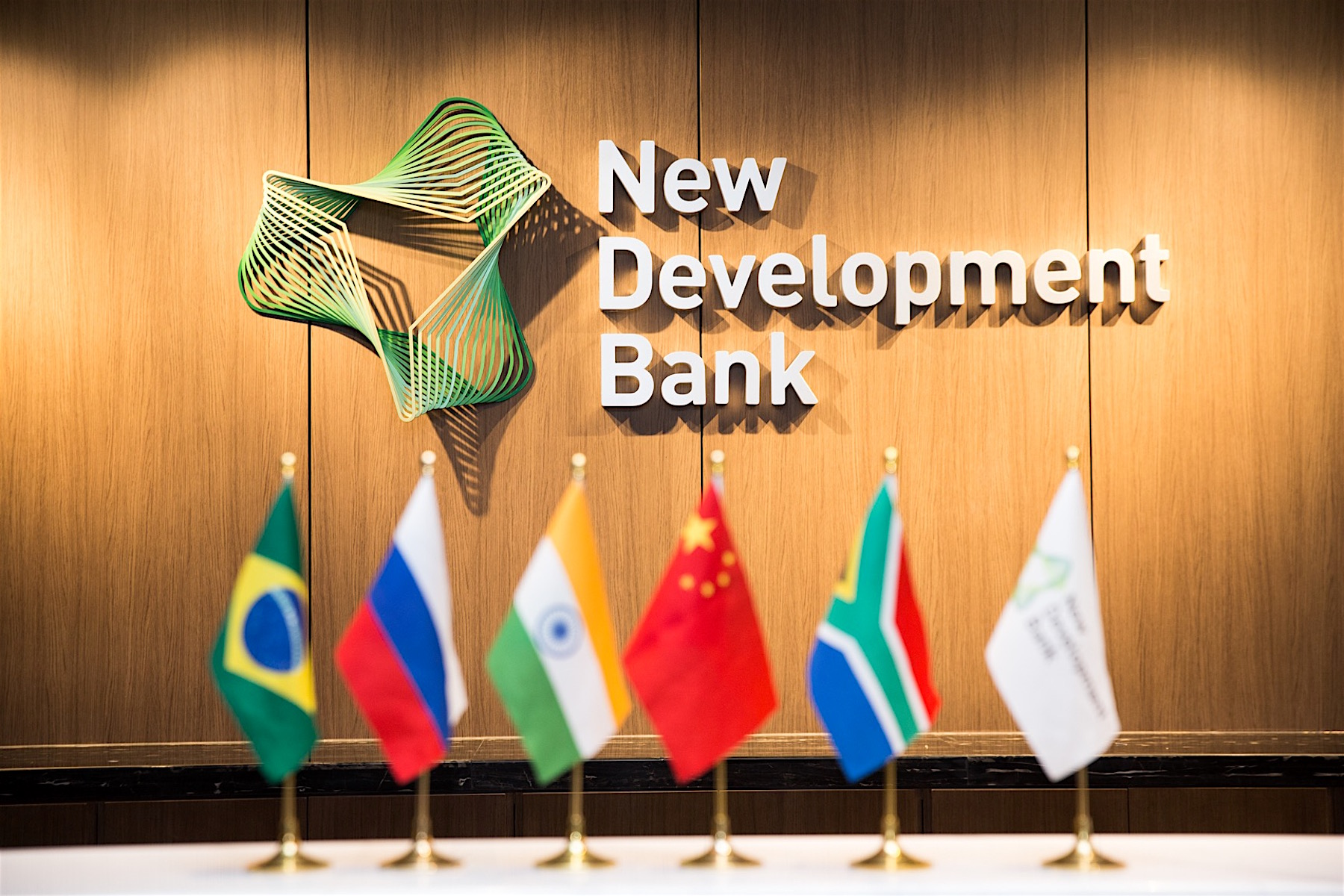
New Development Bank's logo

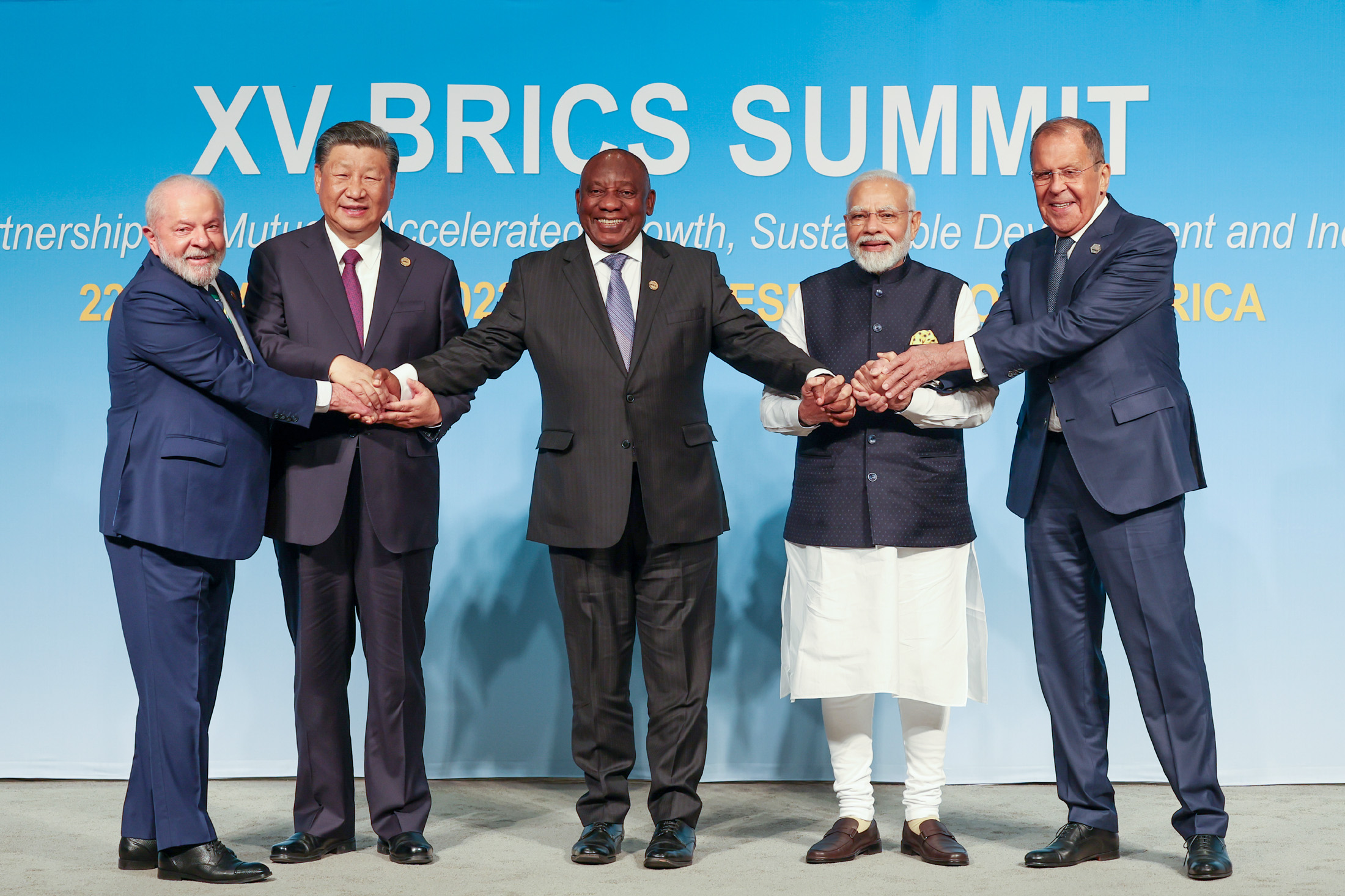
South African President Cyril Ramaphosa and other BRICS representatives during the 15th BRICS summit in Johannesburg, 23 August 2023

In June 2012, the BRICS nations pledged $75 billion to boost the lending power of the International Monetary Fund (IMF). However, the proposed loan was conditional on IMF voting reforms. In March 2013, during the fifth BRICS summit in Durban, the member countries agreed to create a global financial institution to cooperate with the western-dominated IMF and World Bank. They planned to set up this New Development Bank (known at the time as the "BRICS Development Bank") by 2014.

At the BRICS leaders meeting in Saint Petersburg in September 2013, China committed $41 billion towards the pool; Brazil, India, and Russia committed $18 billion each; and South Africa committed $5 billion. China, which held the world's largest foreign exchange reserves and contributed the bulk of the currency pool, wanted a more significant managing role. China also wanted to be the location of the reserve. In October 2013, Russia's Finance Minister Anton Siluanov said that creating a $100 billion in funds designated to steady currency markets would be taken in early 2014. The Brazilian finance minister, Guido Mantega, confirmed that the fund would be created by March 2014. However, by April 2014, the currency reserve pool and development bank had yet to be set up, and the date was rescheduled to 2015.

In July 2014, during the sixth BRICS summit in Fortaleza, the BRICS members signed a document to create the US$100 billion New Development Bank and a reserve currency pool worth over another US$100 billion. Documents on cooperation between BRICS export credit agencies and an agreement of cooperation on innovation were also signed. The Fortaleza summit was followed by a BRICS meeting with the Union of South American Nations presidents in Brasília.

=== Other initiatives ===
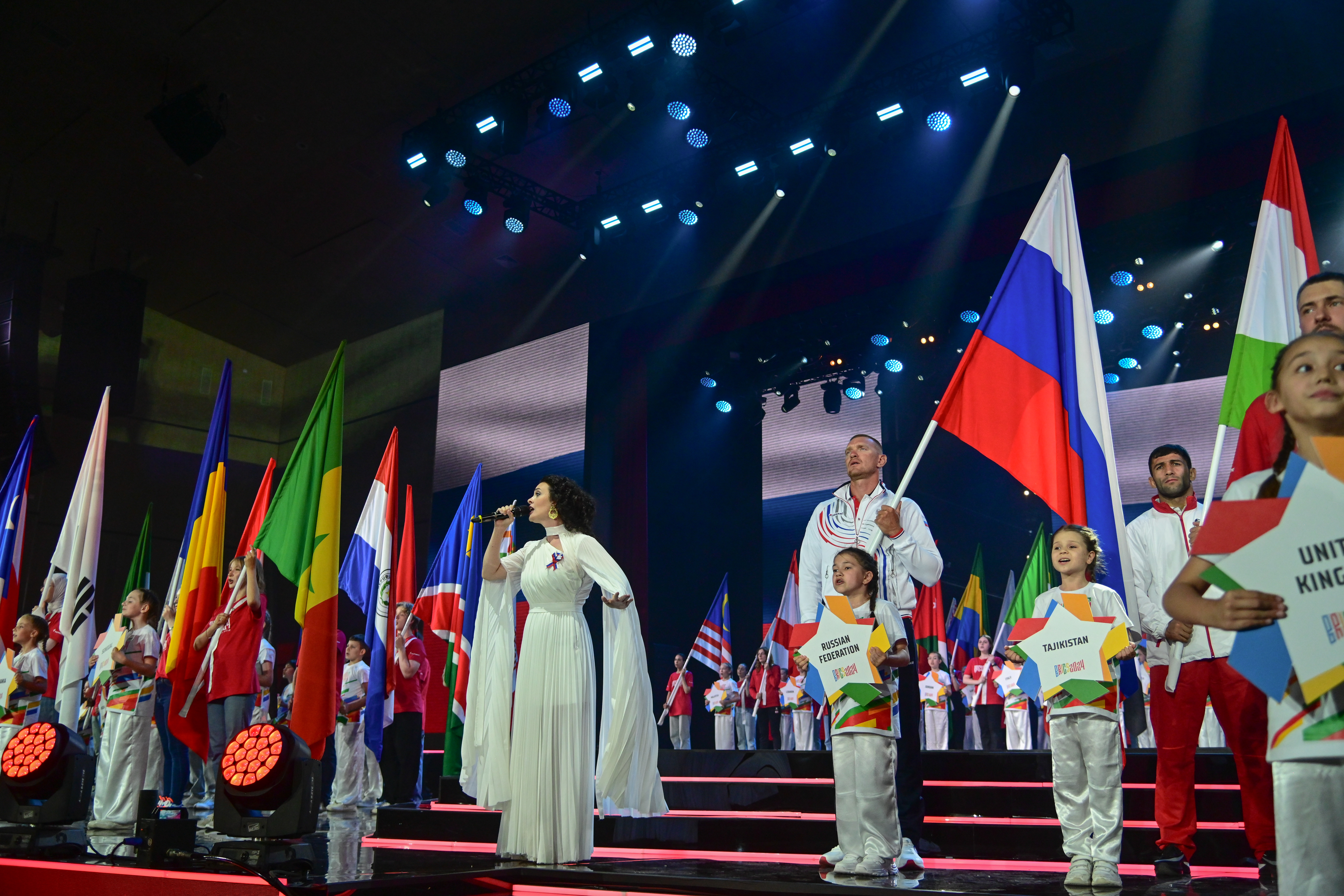
2024 BRICS Games in Russia

Since 2011, the National Institutes of Statistics of the BRICS group of countries Institute of Geography and Statistics (Brazil), Federal State Statistics Service (Russia), the National Bureau of Statistics (China), the Central Statistics Office (India), and Statistics South Africa produce an annual joint statistical publication to put statistical production in perspective, compare adopted methodologies and statistical results. The publication serves as a single data platform for the mutual benefit of participating countries.

Since 2012, the BRICS group of countries has been planning an optical fiber submarine communications cable system to carry telecommunications between the BRICS countries, known as the BRICS Cable. Part of the motivation for the project was the spying of the U.S. National Security Agency on all telecommunications that flowed in and out of United States territory. Construction of the proposed cable network was abandoned in 2015, possibly due to cost.

In August 2019, the communications ministers of the BRICS countries signed a letter of intent to cooperate in the Information and Communication Technology sector. This agreement was signed in the fifth edition of the meeting of communication ministers of countries member of the group held in Brasília, Brazil.

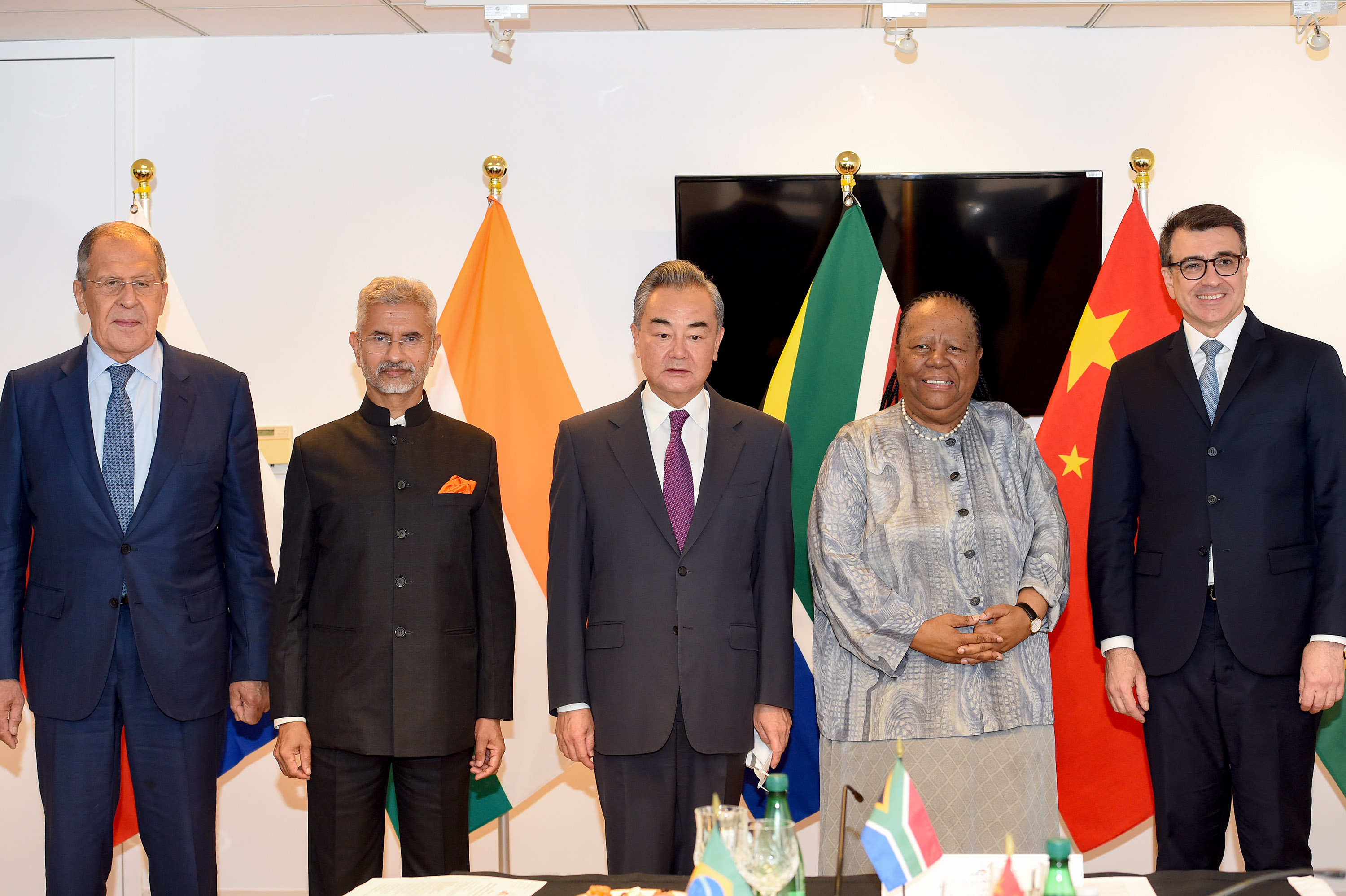
Meeting of BRICS foreign ministers on 22 September 2022

The New Development Bank plans on giving out $15 billion to member states to help their struggling economies. Member countries are hoping for a smooth comeback and a continuation of economic trade pre-COVID-19. The 2020 BRICS summit was held virtually in St. Petersburg, Russia, and discussed how to handle the COVID-19 pandemic and how to fix the multilateral system via reforms. During the 13th BRICS summit, in 2021, Indian Prime Minister Narendra Modi called for a transparent investigation into the origins of COVID-19 under the World Health Organization with the full cooperation of "all countries", and Chinese leader Xi Jinping spoke directly afterwards, calling on BRICS countries to "oppose politicisation" of the process.

In May 2023, South Africa announced that it would be giving diplomatic immunity to Vladimir Putin and other Russian officials so that they could attend the 15th BRICS Summit despite the ICC arrest warrant for Putin. In July 2023, the Russian president announced that he would not personally attend the BRICS summit in Johannesburg on 22–24 August despite good relations with the South African government. Russian news channels noted that Putin would remotely participate online in all BRICS leaders' sessions, including the Business Forum, and also deliver his remarks virtually.

In the first 15 years of BRICS, it produced hundreds of decisions and complied with a majority of them. BRICS has established almost 60 intra-group institutions and a network including think tanks and dialogues in various areas. The group has an agenda of over 30 subjects. These groups include: BRICS Business Council, BRICS Think Tanks Council, BRICS Women's Business Alliance, BRICS Business Forum, and the BRICS Academic Forum. At Kazan the establishment of a BRICS Deep-Sea Resources International Research Center and a BRICS Digital Ecosystem Cooperation Network was announced.

In 2021, BRICS formally agreed to work together to build a satellite constellation and share remote sensing satellite data from it. The constellation will have six existing satellites from China, Russia, and India. In 2023, Russia proposed that the other BRICS members could build a joint research station on its space station.

=== Discussions ===
BRICS has been involved in discussions related to areas of conflict and humanitarian crises such as Afghanistan, Gaza, Lebanon, Sudan, Haiti, Syria and Ukraine. NATO air strikes in Libya were discussed during the third summit. In 2023, South African President Cyril Ramaphosa condemned the conflict in Gaza during an extraordinary virtual summit. In June 2024, BRICS foreign ministers issued a joint statement condemning military attacks and civilian casualties in the Gaza Strip.

=== 2024 expansion ===
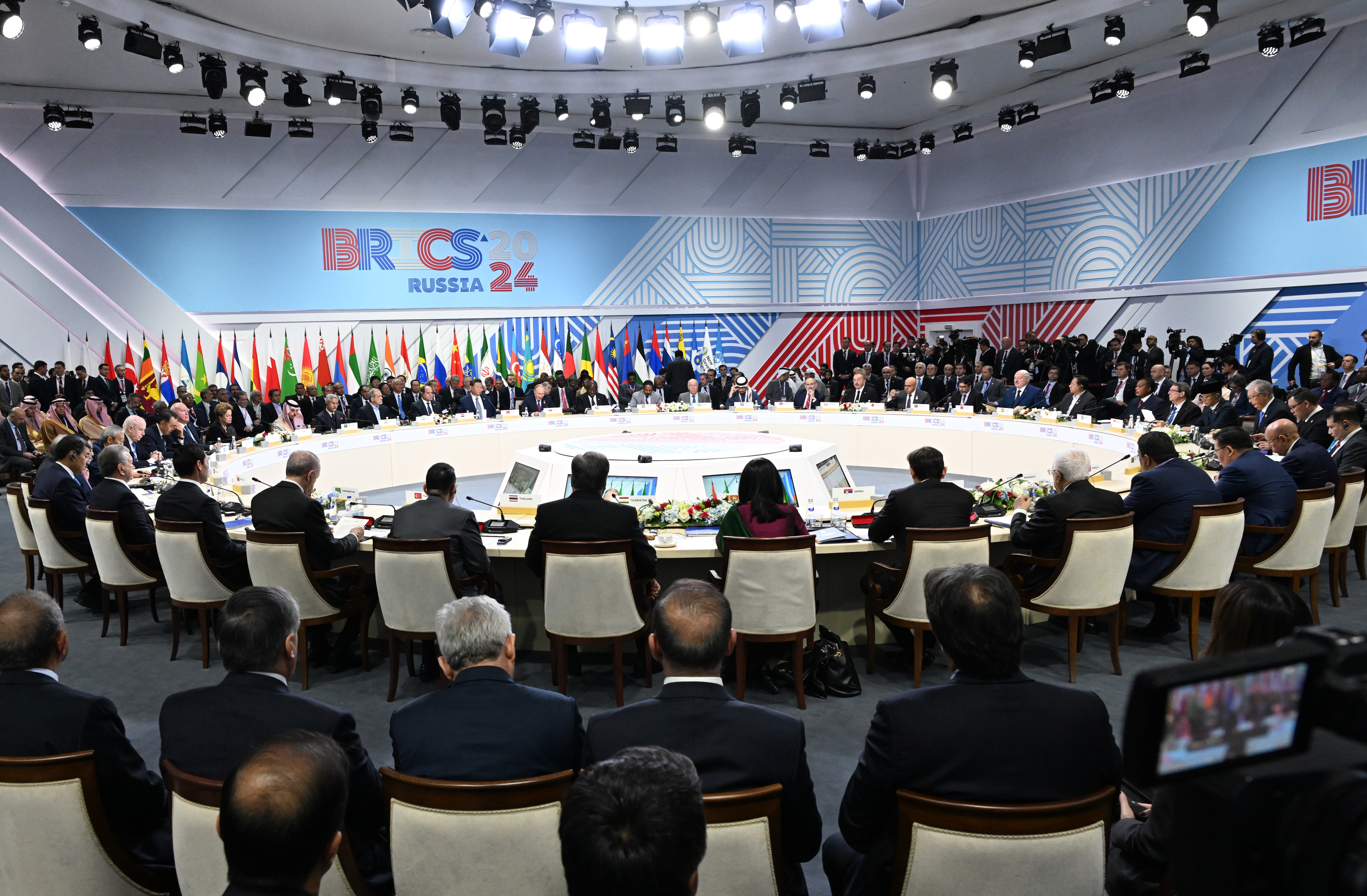
Kazan hosted the first plenary session of the 16th BRICS Summit in the Outreach/BRICS+ format

In August 2023, at the 15th BRICS summit, South African President Cyril Ramaphosa announced that six emerging market group countries (Argentina, Egypt, Ethiopia, Iran, Saudi Arabia, and the United Arab Emirates) had been invited to join the bloc. Full membership was scheduled to take effect on 1 January 2024.

However, the Argentine general election in November 2023 led to a change in president to Javier Milei, who had committed to withdraw the country's membership application. On 30 November 2023, incoming Foreign Minister of Argentina Diana Mondino confirmed that Argentina would not join BRICS. On 29 December 2023, the Government of Argentina sent a letter to all BRICS leaders to officially announce its withdrawal from the application process.

By January 2024, Egypt, Ethiopia, Iran, and the United Arab Emirates joined the bloc, making BRICS membership grow from five to nine countries, while Saudi Arabia delayed its membership. Saudi Arabia did not join BRICS at the start of 2024 as had been planned, and it announced in mid-January that it was still considering the matter. The organizers touted the expansion as part of a plan to build a competing multipolar world order that uses Global South countries to challenge and compete against the western-dominated world order. China Daily used the expansion to claim that more developing countries were interested in joining BRICS.

On 24 October 2024, an additional 13 countries, namely Algeria, Belarus, Bolivia, Cuba, Indonesia, Kazakhstan, Malaysia, Nigeria, Thailand, Turkey, Uganda, Uzbekistan and Vietnam, were invited to participate as "partner countries". The partner status would allow these countries to engage with and benefit from BRICS initiatives. It is unclear whether the countries in this tier have received official membership invitations.

=== 2025 expansion ===
On 6 January 2025, Indonesia joined BRICS officially as a full member, making it the first Southeast Asian state to join the bloc, as well as the 10th member of BRICS. Jakarta's bid got the green light from the bloc in 2023, but the Southeast Asian country asked to join following the 2024 Indonesian presidential election. 2025's BRICS presidency leader and Brazil's Lula announced their official entry. Indonesia's history with the original BRIC members goes back to 2009, when some observers referred to a theorized grouping as "BRIIC" or "BRICI", given Indonesia's growing and stable economy and ties to India and China.

The partnerships that were announced in the previous year went into effect in January 2025 as well. Nigeria joined the partnership countries on 17 January.

=== 2026: Caution on further expansion ===
Leaders of BRICS member and partner countries, outreach invitees and heads of international organisations at the 18th BRICS summit at Bharat Mandapam, New Delhi, 13 September 2026

In May 2026, Russian Foreign Minister Sergey Lavrov stated that BRICS would not rush further expansion at the current stage, emphasizing the need to streamline the grouping's work following its recent enlargement. Lavrov noted that several countries have expressed interest either in becoming full-fledged members or partner countries, but BRICS members have agreed to proceed cautiously. He added that BRICS continues to attract strong international interest as "a model of the future multipolar world order."

=== Status of Saudi Arabia ===
Saudi Arabia's status within BRICS has been described inconsistently by official and independent sources. At the 15th BRICS summit in Johannesburg in August 2023, Saudi Arabia was one of six countries invited to become full members of BRICS from 1 January 2024. Unlike Egypt, Ethiopia, Iran and the United Arab Emirates, which accepted invitations to join the group, Saudi Arabia did not publicly confirm that it had formally accepted its invitation. In January 2024, Saudi Minister of Commerce Majid bin Abdullah Al Qasabi stated that Saudi Arabia had "not yet officially joined BRICS". In May 2025, Reuters reported that Saudi Arabia had "held off formally joining" the group, despite being listed as a member on the official BRICS website.

Official BRICS material has nevertheless classified Saudi Arabia as a full member. The website of the 2025 Brazilian BRICS presidency described BRICS as consisting of eleven countries, including Saudi Arabia, and listed the kingdom among the group's member countries. The Government of India, which holds the 2026 BRICS presidency, has similarly treated Saudi Arabia as one of the eleven BRICS members. A July 2026 government release referred to the "eleven BRICS member countries" and included Saudi Arabia in the list, while an August 2026 release stated that BRICS "brings together eleven" countries and again included Saudi Arabia.

Saudi Arabia's own official terminology has remained inconsistent. During the 17th BRICS summit in July 2025, the Saudi Press Agency (SPA) stated that Saudi Arabia was participating "as an invited country to join the BRICS group", rather than describing it as a member. This inconsistency continued during BRICS meetings in New Delhi in May 2026. On 14 May, SPA reported that the kingdom participated "in its capacity as a BRICS member country", while a report issued the following day stated that "Saudi Arabia participated as an invited country".

Consequently, Saudi Arabia is listed as a BRICS member by official BRICS sources and is treated as one by other members of the organization, while Saudi Arabia continues to maintain ambiguity regarding its status.

== Statistics ==
BRICS+ accounts for 46% of the world's population, and 25% of the world's landmass. The collective GDP of the member countries grew substantially between 1990 and 2019. In 2022, the BRICS+ share of world GDP at purchasing power parity (PPP) was 35.6%, and intra-BRICS trade reached US$614.8 billion. BRICS+ countries operate over 1,200 satellites in orbit, and account for approximately 40% of the world's internet users. According to a 2022 International Trade Centre report, digital payment adoption was 87% in Russia, 86% in China, 81% in South Africa, 77% in Brazil, and 35% in India.

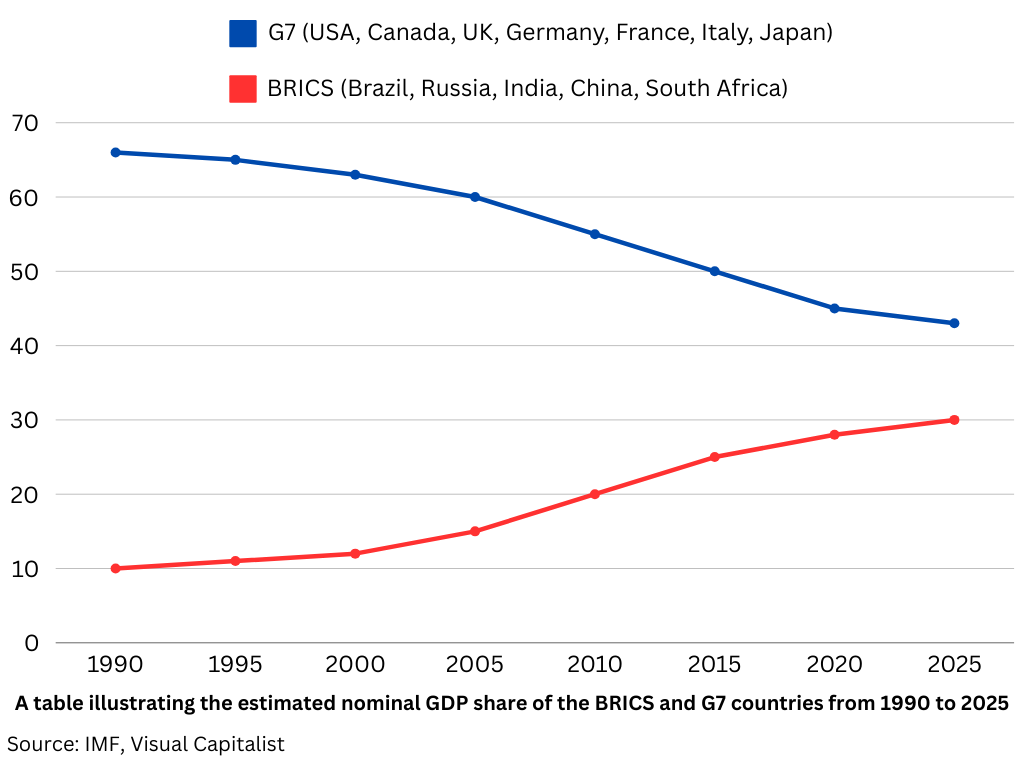
A graph illustrating the estimated nominal GDP (nominal) share of the BRICS and G7 countries from 1990 to 2025

Brazil, India, and China are among the world's ten largest countries by population, area, and gross domestic product (GDP, nominal and PPP). All five initial member states are members of the G20, with a combined nominal GDP of US$28 trillion (about 27% of the gross world product), a total GDP (PPP) of around US$65 trillion (35% of global GDP PPP), and an estimated US$5.2 trillion in combined foreign reserves (as of 2024). BRICS generated close to 32% of global economic output (GDP PPP) in 2022. The expanded BRICS+ generates 36% of global GDP.

Taking into account the GDP PPP of the BRICS+, China accounts for 52%. Economically, the group represents $28.5 trillion. BRICS+ has a larger GDP than both the G7 and the EU. The share of the Chinese renminbi in total intra-BRICS trade transactions is about 47%. In 2017 BRICS accounted for 19% of global investment inflows.

Percent of share of G7 and BRICS GDP (PPP) in world economy as from 1990 to 2022

In 2024, the informality rate was 62% while the labour force participation was 60.8%. BRICS+ oil production is almost 30% of global oil output. BRICS contribute to 45% of the global agricultural products. BRICS countries produce 42% of the world's wheat, 52% of rice, and 46% of soybeans.

According to the Economist Intelligence Unit, the collective size of the economies of BRICS+ will overtake G7 after 2045. United States and United Kingdom have been the top two investors in the bloc in terms of FDI stock in 2020.

GDP nominal share in percentage (as of 2022)
1. G7 (43.7%)
2. BRICS + (28.7%)
3. Rest of world (27.6%)

Comparison between original BRICS-5 and G7 Countries (2024 data)
Parameter	BRICS	G7
No. of countries	5	7
Area (km^{2})	**39.7 million**	21.7 million
Population	**3.3 billion**	0.8 billion
Population Density (people/km^{2})	83	37
HDI	0.734	**0.92**
GDP Growth Rate	▲**4 to 5%**	▲1.5 to 2%
Nominal GDP (USD)	26.7 trillion	**45.3 trillion**
GDP PPP (USD)	**51.6 trillion**	48 trillion
Exports (USD)	5.5 trillion	**6.7 trillion**
Imports (USD)	4.8 trillion	**8.5 trillion**
Military expenditures (USD)	0.48 trillion	**1.20 trillion**

- **Bold** indicates has higher value compared to other.

== Rotating BRICS presidency ==
Leaders' meetings (or leaders' summits) are held once a year on a rotating basis. The presidency rotates annually among the member states, with the host country holding the Pro Tempore presidency for that calendar year. Several ministerial meetings are held during the year, for example, between foreign ministers, finance ministers, central bank governors, trade ministers, and energy ministers. Technical-level meetings focus on project implementation and technical exchanges, such as the meeting of BRICS heads of national statistics offices. There are working groups on technology, culture, education, health, etc. Specialized forums exist, such as the BRICS Business Forum and the BRICS Think Tank Council. The BRICS has neither a permanent seat nor a secretariat.

In 2019, Brazil held the Pro Tempore presidency, prioritizing cooperation in science, technology, innovation, and the digital economy, combating transnational organized crime, and enhancing ties between the New Development Bank and the BRICS Business Council. In 2024, Russia held the presidency, focusing on mutual investment, energy and environmental initiatives, public health, social policy, and regional security dialogues. India assumed the Pro Tempore presidency for 2026.

== List of summits ==
The grouping has held annual summits since 2009, with member countries taking turns to host. Before South Africa's admission, two BRIC summits were held, in 2009 and 2010. The first five-member BRICS summit was held in 2011 in China. The first nine-member BRICS summit was held in 2024 in Russia. The 2020, 2021, and 2022 summits were held via videoconference due to the COVID-19 pandemic.

No.	Dates	Host country	Host leader	Location	Notes	Declaration
1st	16 June 2009	Russia	Dmitry Medvedev	Yekaterinburg	Focused on global economic recovery, financial institution reform amid the Great Recession, food security, and greater representation for emerging economies in international bodies.	Joint Statement
2nd	15 April 2010	Brazil	Luiz Inácio Lula da Silva	Brasília	Addressed post-crisis economic recovery, IMF reform, energy security, and climate change. South African President Jacob Zuma and Palestinian Foreign Minister Riyad al-Maliki attended as guests.	Joint Statement
3rd	14 April 2011	China	Hu Jintao	Sanya	First summit to include South Africa as a full member. Discussions focused on international monetary system reform, commodities price volatility, and multilateral governance.	Sanya Declaration
4th	29 March 2012	India	Manmohan Singh	New Delhi	Focused on global governance reform, sustainable development, and intra-bloc trade. The proposed BRICS Cable submarine telecommunications project was announced.	Delhi Declaration
5th	26–27 March 2013	South Africa	Jacob Zuma	Durban	Agreed on the establishment of the New Development Bank and Contingent Reserve Arrangement. The BRICS Business Council and Think Tanks Council were formally launched.	eThekwini Declaration and Action Plan
6th	14–17 July 2014	Brazil	Dilma Rousseff	Fortaleza	Formal treaties signed establishing the US$100 billion New Development Bank and the BRICS Contingent Reserve Arrangement.	Fortaleza Declaration and Action Plan
7th	8–9 July 2015	Russia	Vladimir Putin	Ufa	Held jointly with the SCO and EAEU summits; entry into force of the New Development Bank and Contingent Reserve Arrangement.	Ufa Declaration
8th	15–16 October 2016	India	Narendra Modi	Benaulim, Goa	Joint outreach summit with BIMSTEC; adopted the Goa Declaration focusing on counterterrorism, trade facilitation, and environmental sustainability.	Goa Declaration
9th	3–5 September 2017	China	Xi Jinping	Xiamen	Included the Dialogue of Emerging Market and Developing Countries (EMDCD); focused on practical economic cooperation, trade liberalization, and international security.	Xiamen Declaration
10th	25–27 July 2018	South Africa	Cyril Ramaphosa	Johannesburg	Focused on industrial collaboration, inclusive growth, and cooperation during the Fourth Industrial Revolution.	Johannesburg Declaration
11th	13–14 November 2019	Brazil	Jair Bolsonaro	Brasília	Themed "Economic Growth for an Innovative Future"; discussed science, technology, innovation, and joint initiatives against transnational organized crime and money laundering.	Brasilía Declaration
12th	21–23 July 2020 (postponed due to COVID-19 pandemic); 17 November 2020 (video conference)	Russia	Vladimir Putin	Saint Petersburg	Held virtually due to the COVID-19 pandemic; addressed pandemic response, public health coordination, and economic recovery.	Moscow Declaration
13th	9 September 2021 (video conference)	India	Narendra Modi	New Delhi	Themed "BRICS@15: Intra-BRICS Cooperation for Continuity, Consolidation and Consensus"; addressed counterterrorism, digital health, and multilateral system reforms.	New Delhi Declaration
14th	23 June 2022 (video conference)	China	Xi Jinping	Beijing	Held virtually; leaders discussed international trade resilience, pandemic recovery, and preliminary proposals for alternative international reserve settlement mechanisms.	Beijing Declaration
15th	22–24 August 2023	South Africa	Cyril Ramaphosa	Johannesburg	Agreed on the historic expansion of the bloc, inviting Argentina, Egypt, Ethiopia, Iran, Saudi Arabia, and the United Arab Emirates. Argentina subsequently declined the invitation, while Saudi Arabia deferred formal ratification.	Johannesburg II Declaration
16th	22–24 October 2024	Russia	Vladimir Putin	Kazan	First summit attended by Egypt, Ethiopia, Iran, and the United Arab Emirates as member states; delegations from 35 countries and six international organizations participated.	Kazan Declaration
17th	6–7 July 2025	Brazil	Luiz Inácio Lula da Silva	Rio de Janeiro	First summit with Indonesia as a full member. Addressed multilateral AI regulation and issued statements against trade protectionism.	Rio Declaration
18th	12–13 September 2026	India	Narendra Modi	New Delhi	Focusing on supply chain resilience, cross-border payments, and utilizing national currencies for trade. Addressing regional conflicts, including developments in West Asia and the Black Sea region impacting maritime trade.	New Delhi Declaration

== Member states ==
Brazil

China

Egypt

Ethiopia

India

Indonesia

Iran

Russia

South Africa

United Arab Emirates
Disputed member:
Saudi Arabia

Official BRICS sources and the Government of India, which holds the 2026 BRICS presidency, list eleven member states.

Country	Capital	Area (km^{2})	Population (2025)	Density (/km^{2})	GDP per cap. (PPP)	HDI	Currency	Official languages	Leaders	Accession
Brazil, Federative Republic of	Brasília	8,515,767	213,583,750	23.8	24,428	0.786	Brazilian real (R$) (BRL)	Portuguese also see Languages of Brazil	Head of State and Government: Luiz Inácio Lula da Silva	16 June 2009 (Informally, September 2006)
Russia; Russian Federation	Moscow	17,075,400	146,028,325	8.4	52,479	0.832	Russian rouble (₽) (RUB)	Russian also see Languages of Russia	Head of State: Vladimir Putin; Head of Government: Mikhail Mishustin	16 June 2009 (Informally, September 2006)
India, Republic of	New Delhi	3,287,240	1,417,492,000	430.7	12,801	0.685	Indian rupee (₹) (INR)	Hindi (Devanagari script); English; Also see Languages of India	Head of State: Droupadi Murmu; Head of Government: Narendra Modi	16 June 2009 (Informally, September 2006)
China, People's Republic of	Beijing	9,640,011 (Note: The actual area under PRC control is 9,596,960.)	1,408,280,000	147	31,596	0.797	Renminbi (Chinese yuan, ¥) (CNY)	Standard Chinese written in simplified characters see also languages of China	Party General Secretary and State Representative: Xi Jinping; Head of Government: Li Qiang	16 June 2009 (Informally, September 2006)
South Africa, Republic of	Pretoria (executive); Cape Town (legislative); Bloemfontein (judicial)	1,221,037	63,100,945	50.8	16,740	0.741	South African rand (R) (ZAR)	12 languages	Head of State and Government: Cyril Ramaphosa	24 December 2010
Egypt, Arab Republic of	Cairo	1,010,408	107,271,260	108.32	23,321	0.754	Egyptian pound (LE) (EGP)	Arabic	Head of State: Abdel Fattah el-Sisi; Head of Government: Mostafa Madbouly	1 January 2024
Ethiopia, Federal Democratic Republic of	Addis Ababa	1,104,300	109,499,000	92.7	4,974	0.497	Ethiopian birr (Br) (ETB)	Afar; Amharic; Oromo; Somali; Tigrinya	Head of State: Taye Atske Selassie; Head of Government: Abiy Ahmed	1 January 2024
Iran, Islamic Republic of	Tehran	1,648,195	92,417,681	52	20,279	0.799	Iranian rial (Rl) (IRR)	Persian	Head of State: Mojtaba Khamenei; Head of Government: Masoud Pezeshkian	1 January 2024
United Arab Emirates	Abu Dhabi	83,600	11,027,129	132	87,774	0.940	UAE dirham (AED)	Arabic	Head of State: Mohamed bin Zayed Al Nahyan; Head of Government: Mohammed bin Rashid Al Maktoum	1 January 2024
Indonesia, Republic of	Jakarta	1,904,569	284,438,782	143	18,973	0.728	Indonesian rupiah (Rp) (IDR)	Indonesian	Head of State and Government: Prabowo Subianto	6 January 2025

=== Disputed member ===
Country	Capital	Area (km^{2})	Population (2025)	Density (/km^{2})	GDP per cap. (PPP)	HDI	Currency	Official languages	Leaders	Accession
Saudi Arabia, Kingdom of	Riyadh	2,149,690	34,566,328	16.1	78,815	0.900	Saudi riyal (ر.س) (SAR)	Arabic	Head of State: Salman of Saudi Arabia; Head of Government: Mohammed bin Salman	Invited to join from 1 January 2024 (Note: Saudi Arabia's BRICS membership is disputed. Official BRICS sources list Saudi Arabia as a BRICS member, while the country maintains ambiguity regarding its status. See Status of Saudi Arabia for discussion of its status.)

== Financial architecture ==
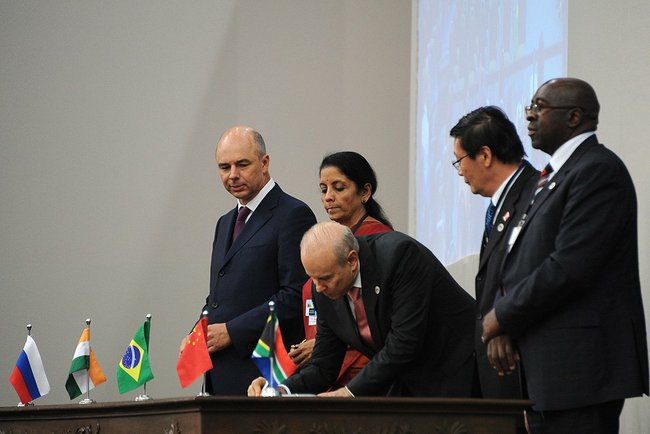
The New Development Bank (NDB) and Contingent Reserve Arrangement (CRA) were signed into treaty at the 2014 BRICS summit in Brazil.

The group is dominated by China, which has the largest share of the group's GDP, accounting for about 70% of the organization's total. The financial architecture of BRICS is made of the New Development Bank (NDB) and the Contingent Reserve Arrangement (CRA). These components were signed into a treaty in 2014 and became active in 2015.

=== New Development Bank ===
The New Development Bank (NDB), formally referred to as the BRICS Development Bank, is a multilateral development bank operated by the five BRICS states. The bank's primary focus of lending is infrastructure projects with authorized lending of up to $34 billion annually. South Africa hosts the African headquarters of the bank. The bank has a starting capital of $50 billion, with wealth increased to $100 billion over time. Brazil, Russia, India, China, and South Africa initially contributed $10 billion each to bring the total to $50 billion. As of 2020, it had 53 projects underway worth around $15 billion. By 2024 the bank had approved more than $32 billion for 96 projects. In 2021, Bangladesh, Egypt, the United Arab Emirates and Uruguay joined the NDB.

=== BRICS Contingent Reserve Arrangement ===
The BRICS Contingent Reserve Arrangement (CRA) is a framework for protecting against global liquidity pressures. This includes currency issues where members' national currencies are being adversely affected by global financial pressures. Emerging economies that experienced rapid economic liberalization went through increased economic volatility, bringing an uncertain macroeconomic environment. The CRA competes with the International Monetary Fund (IMF). Along with the New Development Bank, it is an example of increasing South-South cooperation. It was established in 2015 by the BRICS countries. The legal basis is formed by the Treaty for the Establishment of a BRICS Contingent Reserve Arrangement, signed in Fortaleza in July 2014. Its inaugural meetings of the BRICS CRA Governing Council and Standing Committee were held on 4 September 2015, in Ankara, Turkey. It entered into force upon ratification by all BRICS states, announced at the 7th BRICS summit in July 2015.

=== BRICS payment system ===
At the 2015 BRICS summit in Russia, ministers from the BRICS states initiated consultations for a payment system that would be an alternative to the SWIFT system. The stated goal was to initially move to settlements in national currencies. The Central Bank of Russia highlighted the main benefits as backup and redundancy in case there were disruptions to the SWIFT system.

China also launched its alternative to SWIFT: the Cross-Border Interbank Payment System, which enables financial institutions worldwide to send and receive information about financial transactions. India also has its alternative Structured Financial Messaging System (SFMS), as do Russia SPFS and Brazil Pix.

=== Potential common currency and BRICS Bridge ===
BRICS countries committed to study the feasibility of a new common currency or similar, at the 2023 BRICS summit in South Africa. Fair and easier international trade, as well as a major reduction in costs of transactions, would be some of the reasons for the countries to forge a currency union.

BRICS Bridge — a successor to MBridge, and probably a merger with BRICS PAY — makes it possible for central banks to support cross-border transactions and payments with their own central bank digital currency (CBDC) based on an automatic Cross-Border Interbank Payment System for settlement and clearance. It is designed to be independent of any single nation or central bank, and every central bank can opt out and has control of its CBDC exchange rate.

A conceptual proposal for a common currency has been informally referred to as "R5", derived from the initials of the five original member currencies: the real, ruble, rupee, renminbi, and rand. A symbolic banknote mockup was presented during the 16th summit in Kazan, Russia.

In parallel with institutional initiatives, a proposal has been put forward for a supranational currency known as UNIT, designed by the International Reserve and Investment Asset System (IRIAS). Each coin would be backed by a fixed reserve basket of 40% physical gold and 60% fiat currencies, with its value measured in a gold-equivalent standard. The system is designed to be decentralized, allowing qualified nodes (sovereign or private) to mint tokens by depositing the required assets. While not an official BRICS initiative, it has been discussed as a potential mechanism to facilitate cross-border trade and investment, reduce reliance on single-nation reserve currencies, and enhance financial multipolarity.

== Peace and security ==
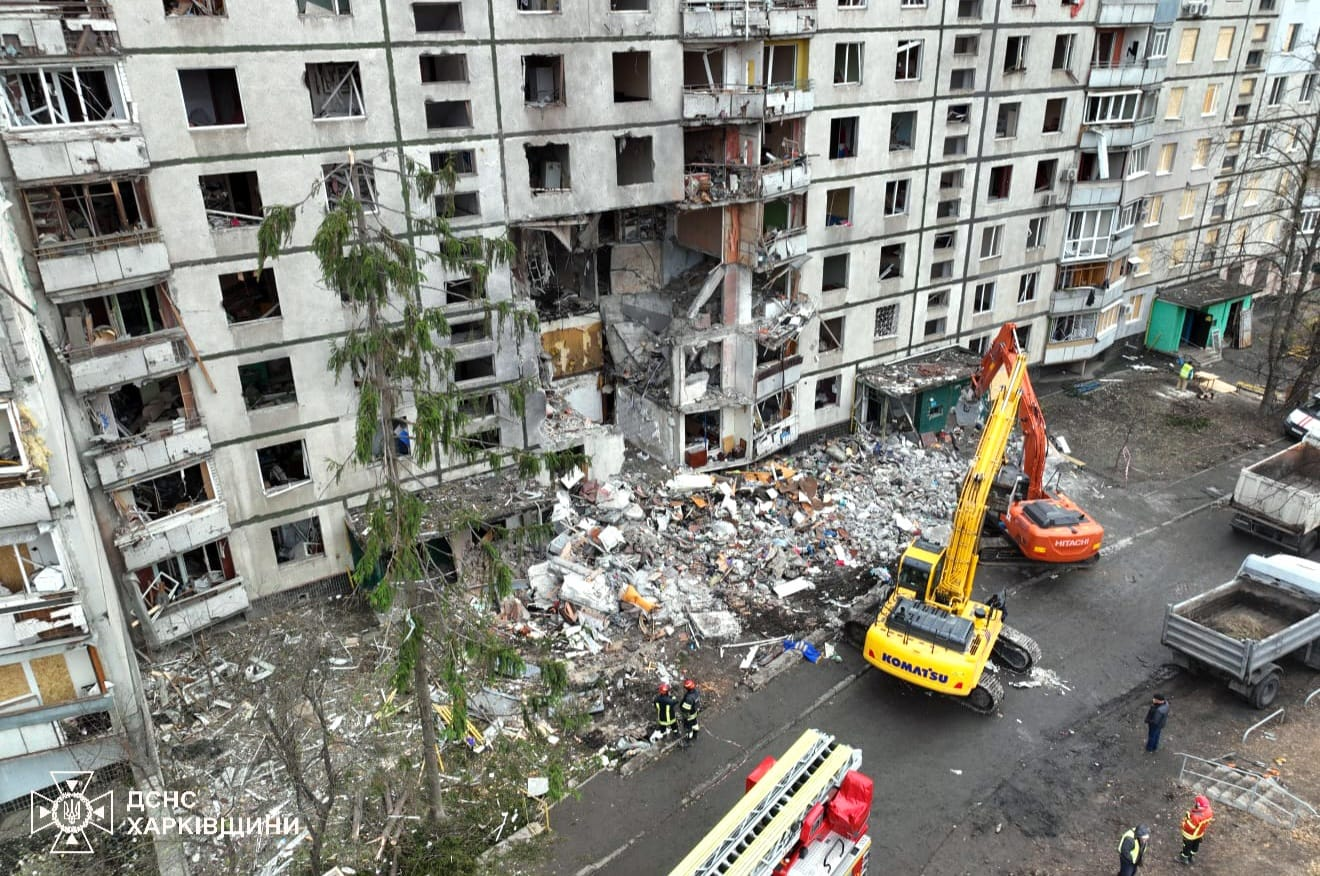
Kharkiv, Ukraine after the Russian attack on 30 October 2024

During the 16th BRICS Summit in Kazan, Russia, the organization issued the Kazan Declaration. Among the key points included in the statement are emphasizing acts that align with the Purposes and Principles of the UN Charter for a peaceful resolution to the conflict in Ukraine. They also expressed concern on the escalation in the Middle East, which included the Gaza war and the attack on Lebanon.

At the 17th BRICS Summit in Rio de Janeiro, leaders adopted a declaration condemning the Pahalgam attack "in the strongest terms". Prime Minister Narendra Modi described the attack as a "direct attack on the soul, identity and dignity of India".

During the conflict between Israel and Iran in June 2025, the bloc declared the strikes a "violation of international law". During subsequent operations involving the United States, Israel, and Iran, BRICS did not issue a collective organizational statement, though several founding members—including China, Russia, and South Africa—issued independent statements.

The differing positions of BRICS members on the Russian invasion of Ukraine have complicated the group's ability to adopt common statements on the conflict. The 2026 New Delhi Declaration did not specifically mention the war in Ukraine, in contrast to the 2024 and 2025 BRICS declarations, which addressed the conflict. The omission was reported as reflecting the difficulty of reaching consensus among members with different positions on the war.

The 2026 Iran war also exposed divisions within BRICS. A May 2026 BRICS foreign ministers' meeting ended without a common position on the conflict after members disagreed over how to respond to the United States and Israel's military action against Iran. At the September summit, the members instead agreed on a general call for "maximum restraint" and a diplomatic resolution, while the declaration acknowledged their respective national positions on the situation in the Middle East.

In January 2026, China, Russia and Iran began a joint naval exercise with South Africa and was joined by Indonesia, Ethiopia and Brazil as observers.

== Environment ==
BRICS member states collectively represent major global greenhouse gas emitters as well as developing economies seeking climate finance. Under India's 2026 presidency theme, "Building for Resilience, Innovation, Cooperation, and Sustainability", debates have centered on addressing disparities in global climate financing, where approximately $1.9 trillion is committed annually compared to an estimated $7.4 trillion required, particularly for climate adaptation.

Member states have expressed joint opposition to unilateral environmental trade measures, such as the European Union's Carbon Border Adjustment Mechanism (CBAM), characterizing them as discriminatory barriers that could, for instance, reduce India's steel export revenues by $25 million in 2026. Analysts have noted that India's presidency could serve as a platform to coordinate carbon market policies, mobilize the New Development Bank for sustainable projects, and engage collectively with multilateral initiatives such as Brazil's Open Coalition on Compliance Carbon Markets to influence international carbon standards.

== Reception ==
World analysts have highlighted potential divisions and weaknesses in the grouping, including significant economic instabilities, disagreements among the members over UN Security Council reform, and India and China's disputes over territorial issues. There is scope for multilateralism in space, and collaboration in the space governance sector.

ILO Director-General Guy Ryder has received the joint declarations and statements of the Labour and Employment Ministers of the BRICS with a positive attitude over the years. These statements cover decent work, social dialogue, green jobs, skills development, and workers' protection.

=== Belgium ===
Christian E. Rieck of the Global Governance Institute writes in October 2024 that China's relative power distribution in BRICS is "4+1". He notes how China has pushed for enlargement, while India and Brazil have wanted to maintain the group's exclusive relationship with China as well as its non-Western stance. According to Rieck, although BRICS supports multipolarity and non-alignment, it also does not take an explicitly anti-Western stance. He also argues that BRICS' efforts to construct new financial architectures should not be actively challenged, as that will only be counterproductive, and that Europe should not feel threatened by BRICS.

Alicia García-Herrero, who writes for the think tank Bruegel, argued that the West should note the anti-West sentiment developing amongst BRICS, and that the West needs to offer the Global South better economic deals.

Reinhold Brender of the Egmont Institute wrote in November 2024 that the pivot toward BRICS by several countries in the Global South, especially visible during the Kazan summit, should be a "wake-up call" for the EU. To address this, Brender argued that the EU should think beyond BRICS in relation to the Global South.

=== Brazil ===
In 2014, an opinion poll of 1881 respondents found that only 4% knew what BRICS stood for, while in 2019, only 3% of 1849 respondents knew what the acronym stood for.

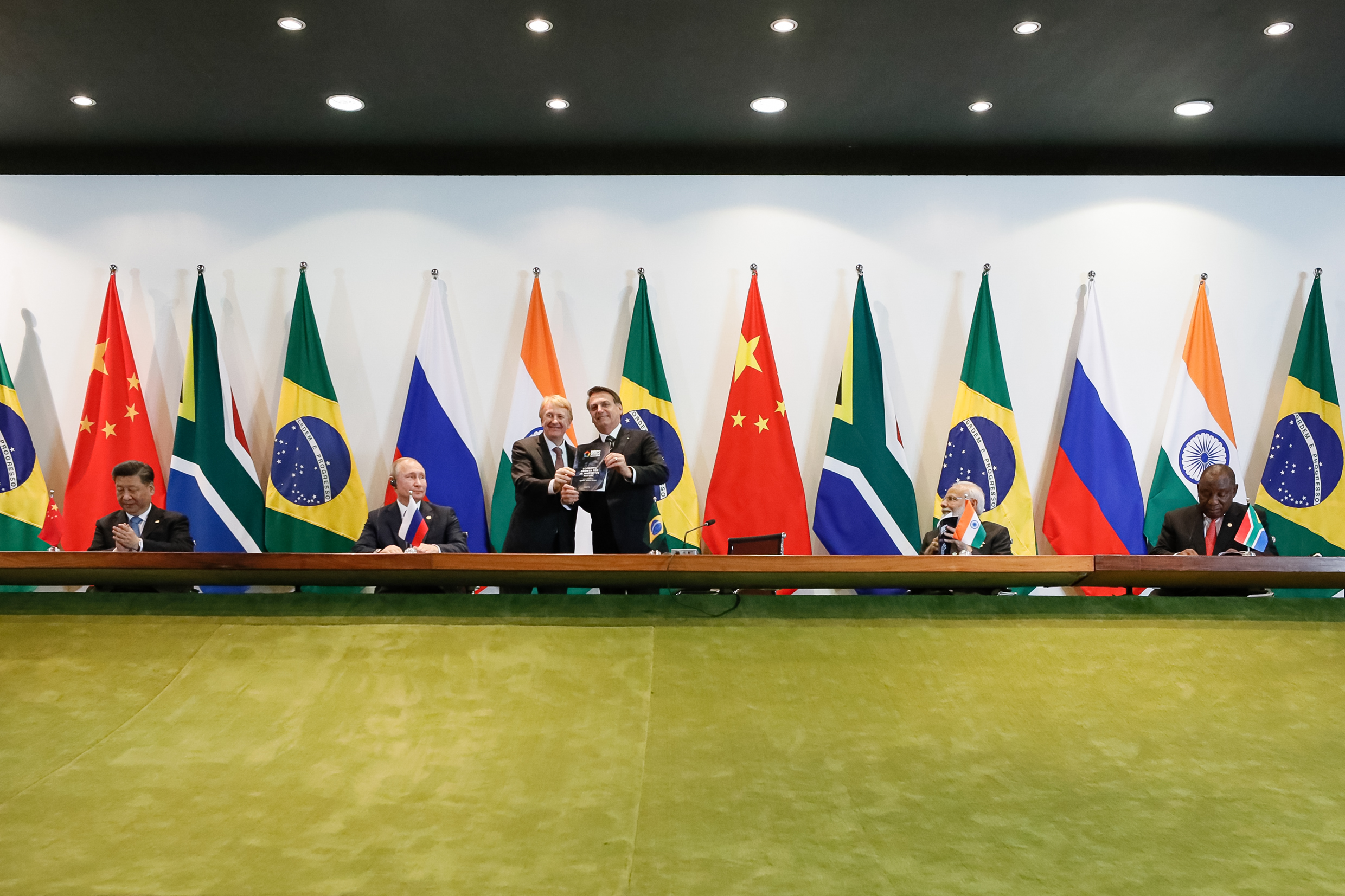
The five leaders of BRICS in Brasília, Brazil, in November 2019

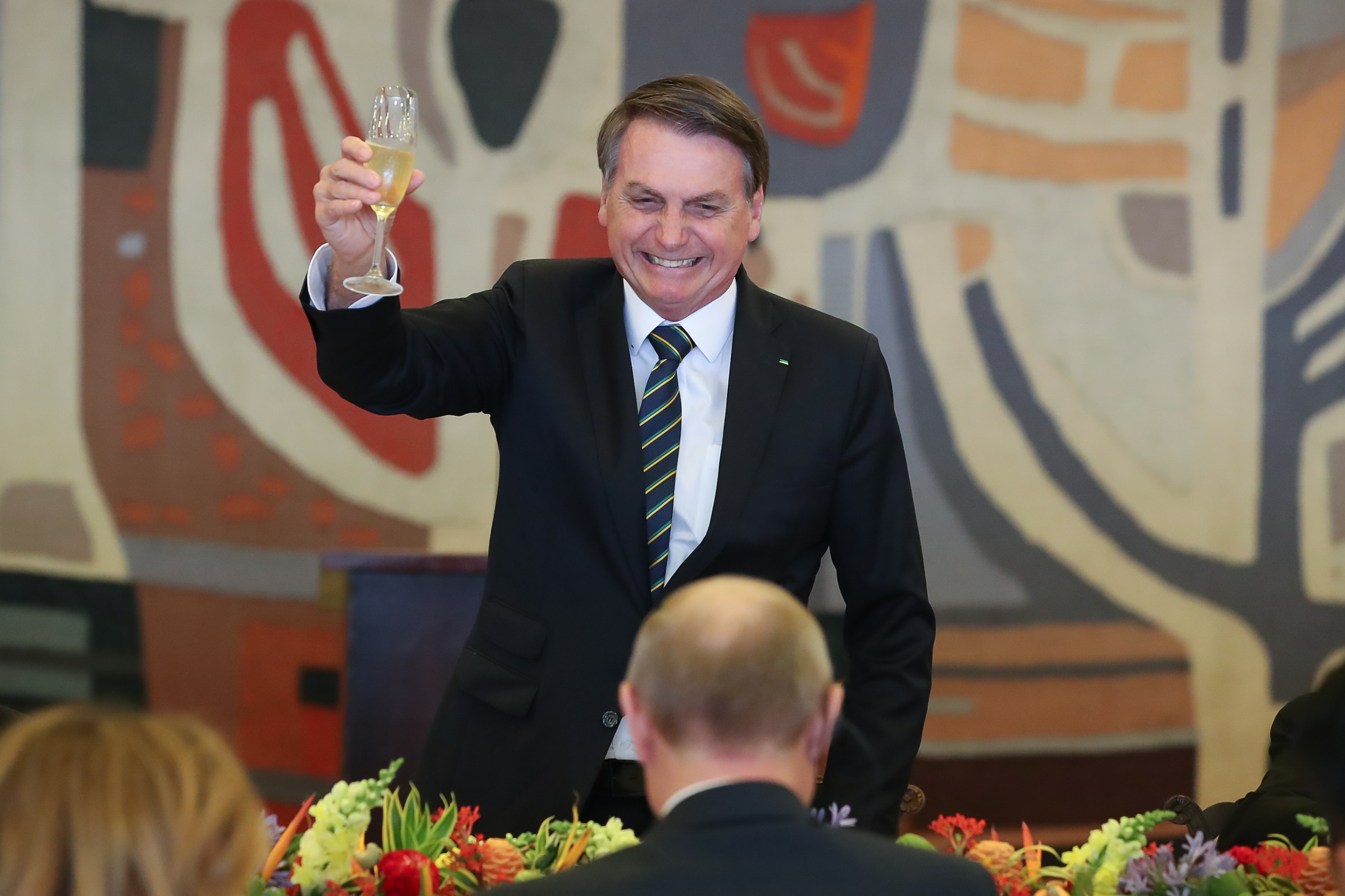
Former Brazilian president Jair Bolsonaro welcoming the BRICS leaders

=== Canada ===
Alissa Wang, co-chair, summit studies, BRICS Research Group, University of Toronto, in a presentation prepared in July 2023, discusses that the possibility of BRICS becoming anti-Western is not likely. The group consists of three democracies – Brazil, India, South Africa, and two non-democratic regimes – Russia, China –, this political diversity limits the group uniting on an anti-western stance. Further, a BRICS expansion would strengthen the group economically, but political jointness could be negatively affected.

=== China ===
In 2012, Hu Jintao, the then General Secretary of the Chinese Communist Party and President of China, described the BRICS countries as defenders and promoters of developing countries and a force for world peace.

In March 2025, the government-affiliated think tank Shanghai Institutes for International Studies (SIIS) published a report where they said that BRICS was not an anti-Western entity but a non-Western entity seeking a "just and reasonable post-Western order".

=== France ===
French President Emmanuel Macron sought to become the first Western leader at a BRICS summit in 2023. Russia's Foreign Ministry stated that it would be "unsuitable" and that France's participation would not help BRICS reach the goals of developing countries in a multipolar world.

=== Germany ===
A Friedrich Ebert Foundation perspective from September 2013 notes how BRICS members, for the first time, with Russia as an exception, are really acting on an international level. German diplomat Reinhard Bütikofer, following the announcement of the expansion of BRICS in 2023, stated that developing countries may turn to BRICS "if Europe fails to prove its reliability and credibility as a fair partner".

A Friedrich Naumann Foundation for Freedom policy paper explains that while the expansion of BRICS is a wake-up call, the EU or Germany need not make any direct formal contact with BRICS until the goals of BRICS are officially defined. "Western-oriented BRICS countries ... should be more closely integrated into global governance."

=== India ===
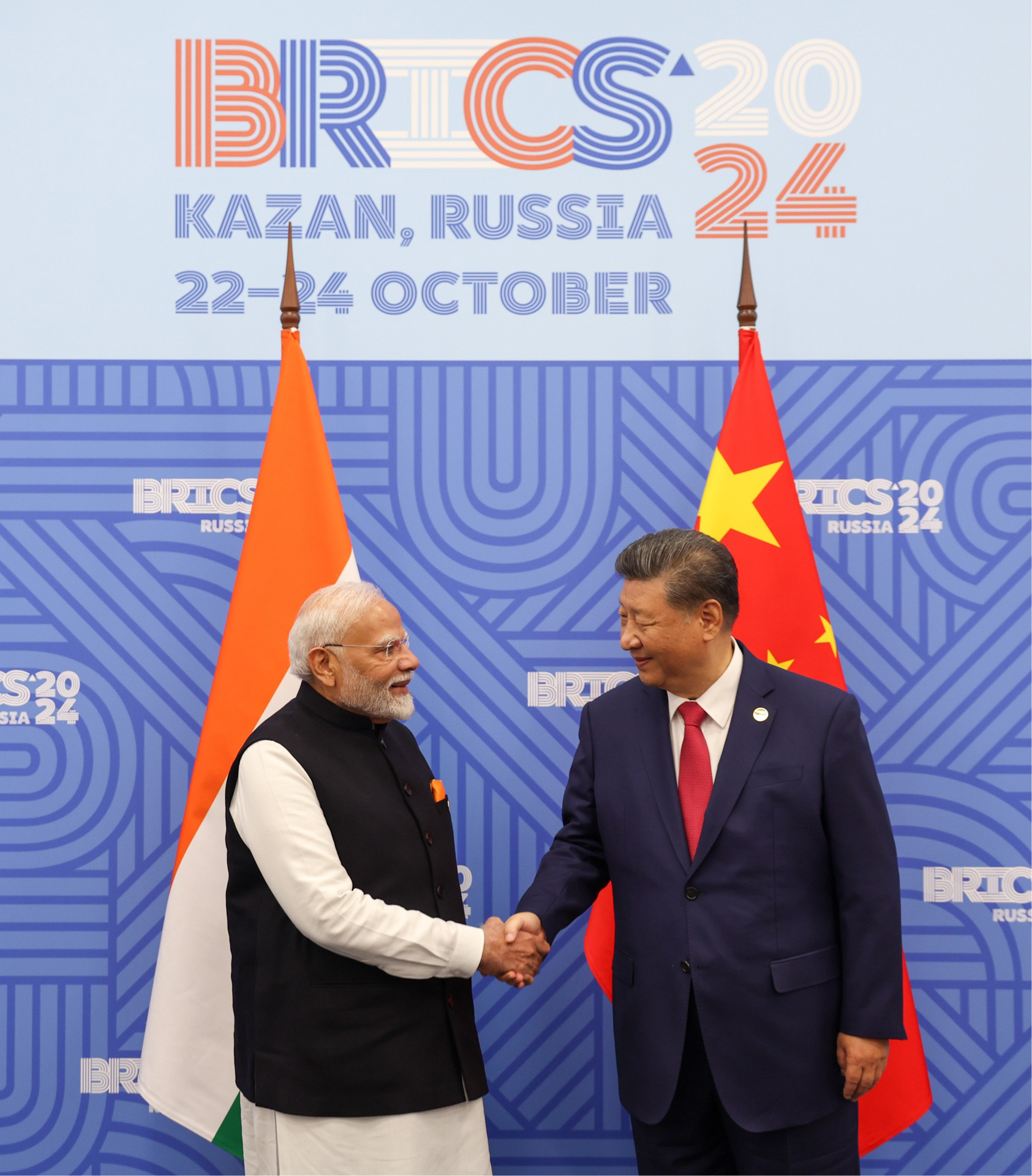
Indian Prime Minister Narendra Modi and Chinese President Xi Jinping at the 16th BRICS summit in Kazan, October 2024

In 2014, the Indian Marxist author Vijay Prashad raised the limitations of the BRICS as a political and economic "locomotive of the South" because they follow neoliberal policies. They have neither established new counter-balancing institutions nor come up with an alternative ideology. Furthermore, the BRICS project, argues Prashad, cannot challenge the primacy of the United States and NATO.

Speaking at the BRICS summit in 2014, Prime Minister Narendra Modi said that "reform of institutions of global governance ... has been on the BRICS agenda since its inception."

In 2016, Brahma Chellaney writes whether BRICS will be able to construct institutionalized structures, including "institutionalized cooperation". He writes that BRICS is "the first important non-Western global initiative of the post-Cold War world".

The Sino-Indian border dispute, for example during the 2020 Galwan Valley clash, has been a bilateral non-issue for BRICS. In another case where a BRICS summit acted as a "forcing event", the Doklam standoff in 2017, India stated that it may pull out of the 2017 BRICS Xiamen Summit, causing China to pull back its troops and India to attend the summit. During the 2023 BRICS summit, China and India agreed to make efforts to address border issues. However, following the 2023 BRICS summit, China released a disputed map. Ashok Malik comments that amid new BRICS members and partners, India should ensure the group doesn't get a "distortionary ideological edge".

In 2024, India's External Affairs Minister S Jaishankar has stated, "because you won't let us into the G7 club," with reference to India's participation in BRICS and the current trend of global governance for emerging economies and rising powers. The EAM also stated that G7 exists despite G20, so BRICS should also be allowed to exist.

Prior to the Kazan summit, Prime Minister Narendra Modi stated that BRICS was never meant to be against anyone or be anti-western, and that it is only non-western. At the Kazan summit the Prime Minister stated "We must be careful to ensure that this organization does not acquire the image of one that is trying to replace global institutions". Indian diplomat Meera Shankar noted "the new payment systems discussed in BRICS are still in the exploratory phase and do not pose a challenge to the dominance of the US dollar in the medium term."

The central bank of India, Reserve Bank of India, Governor Shaktikanta Das, stated in December 2024 that dedollarisation for India was only a part of "derisking" Indian trade and reducing dependence on any one currency since that may become "problematic". While a BRICS currency had been raised by a member state, nothing specific was decided. He also compared the Euro and stated how nations in Euro countries are located in proximity, while that is not the case with BRICS. This was in response to a question about President-elect Trump's warning about tariffs. Former ambassador D. Bala Venkatesh Varma, in an interview with the think tank India Foundation, states that India's stance in BRICS is "pro-India" and "claiming that BRICS is dominated by China is an exaggeration".

At the 17th BRICS summit held in Rio de Janeiro in July 2025, Prime Minister Narendra Modi outlined India's agenda for its 2026 presidency under the proposed theme "Building Resilience, Innovation, Cooperation, and Sustainability". Modi advocated for a people-centric focus for the Global South and reiterated calls for comprehensive structural reforms in international bodies, including the United Nations Security Council and the World Trade Organization.

During the 18th BRICS Summit in September 2026, the all vegetarian gala dinner menu hosted by India drew political criticism from congress party leaders, who accused the government of imposing dietary preferences on international delegates.

=== Iran ===
Iran's admission as a member in 2023 has been touted by the country as a "strategic success". President Ebrahim Raisi stated, "the global confidence in the effectiveness of BRICS is increasing". Foreign Minister Hossein Amir-Abdollahian stated that Iran's membership will help in strengthening the multilateralism of BRICS.

=== Russia ===
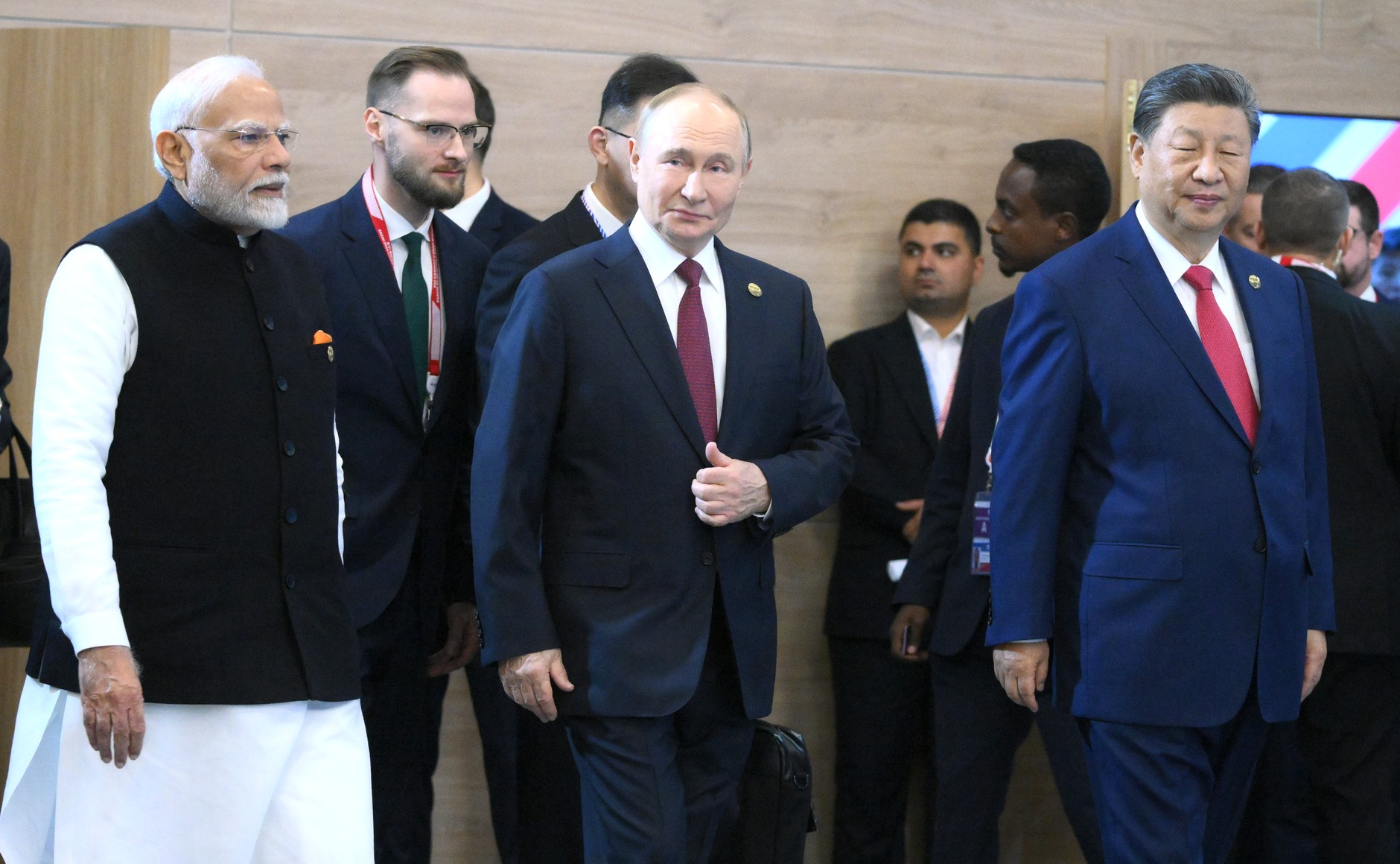
Indian Prime Minister Narendra Modi, Russian President Vladimir Putin and Chinese President Xi Jinping at the 16th BRICS summit in Kazan, Russia, 23 October 2024

In 2015, President Vladimir Putin stated that despite BRICS being a young organisation, it has already been effective. The five countries "are playing an active part in shaping a multipolar world order and developing modern models for the world's financial and trading systems."

In 2024, President Putin speaking at a BRICS forum said "BRICS is one of the key elements of the emerging multipolar world order, which increasingly reflects the interests and aspirations of the states of both the global South and the East ... we are engaged in an active dialogue in the BRICS plus/outreach format, and are working to establish a category of partner states". At the Kazan summit President Putin made clear that they are not attempting to reject the dollar, but rather getting ready with alternatives to a weaponized dollar. In a briefing in October 2024, the Russian Foreign Ministry Spokeswoman said that the "BRICS framework is non-confrontational and constructive", and that "it is a viable alternative to a world living by someone else's, alien rules". She added that new members have made BRICS into a stronger representative of the "Global South and East – or the Global Majority". Applications from various countries reinforces BRICS role. President Putin quoted Prime Minister Narendra Modi in saying that BRICS is not anti-Western but non-Western.

A poll following the Kazan summit revealed that 39% of 1,500 respondents had never heard about BRICS. Among those who had heard of the summit, the informal visual of the BRICS currency banknote was polled as the most unforgettable happening. In 2025, Victoria Panova, Head of the BRICS Expert Council—Russia, stated that while BRICS aims to make a fairer world order, it "doesn't have an aim of expansion as an aim in itself." The aim isn't to duplicate the UN's General Assembly.

In March 2025, President Putin suggested that BRICS countries could be a part of the Ukraine peace process. According to Valdai Discussion Club's Dmitry Suslov in October 2024, there are many intra-BRICS disagreements. Firstly, prior cooperation and current relationship with the West are major factors in making decisions where BRICS countries are concerned. Secondly, the speed of decision-making varies with respect to making changes in economic governance, say when it concerns a new currency or settlement mechanism. Third, bilateral relations between countries such as China and India and Saudi Arabia and Iran have not always been amicable.

=== Ukraine ===
In an October 2024 interview with The Times of India, President Volodymyr Zelenskyy said that the Kazan summit in Russia was a total failure. President Zelenskyy also criticized the presence of the UN Secretary General at the summit. The office of the UN secretary general clarified his participation, referring to BRICS's role "in boosting global co-operation".

=== United States ===
On 9 April 2013, Isobel Coleman, a director at the American think tank Council on Foreign Relations, and later U.S. representative to the UN, claimed that the BRICS members share a lack of consensus. They uphold drastically different political systems, from vibrant liberal democracies in Brazil and South Africa to entrenched oligarchy in Russia, and their economies are poorly integrated and differ in size by orders of magnitude. She also claimed that the significant difference in GDP influences the reserves: China accounts for over 41% of the contribution, which in turn leads to its bigger political say within the association.

A multi-year study at Tufts University published in July 2023 found that the "common portrayal of BRICS as a China-dominated group primarily pursuing anti-U.S. agendas" was misplaced. The study asserted: "The BRICS countries connect around common development interests and a quest for a multipolar world order in which no single power dominates. Yet BRICS consolidation has turned the group into a potent negotiation force that now challenges Washington's geopolitical and economic goals". According to the Atlantic Council's Thomas Hill in December 2023, the de-dollarization efforts within BRICS, particularly in North Africa, present a significant challenge to US interests. Replacing the dollar could limit the US's ability to run deficits and maintain low interest rates, and undermine the effectiveness of US sanctions and SWIFT.

Michael Kugelman writes in the BBC that "BRICS projects meant to reduce reliance on the US dollar likely aren't viable, because many member states' economies cannot afford to wean themselves off of it." White House Press Secretary and White House National Security Advisor have said that BRICS is not seen as becoming a geopolitical rival. Treasury Secretary Janet Yellen has largely dismissed BRICS efforts at de-dollarization. Following the announcement of the expansion of BRICS in 2023, the US National Security Advisor stated that it does not pose a "serious challenge".

In November 2024 in a post on Truth Social, United States president-elect Donald Trump threatened a 100% U.S. tariff on countries that pursued a BRICS currency or moved to favor another currency instead of the U.S. dollar. As U.S. president he announced the same on his first day in office during his second term. On 31 January 2025, President Trump posted on Truth Social to "go find another sucker Nation" with respect to BRICS. In February 2025, in a press briefing, he stated that "BRICS is dead". He went on to say that BRICS is silent following his "150%" tariff threat.

Joseph Nye writes in January 2025 that BRICS, "as a means of escaping diplomatic isolation, it is certainly useful to Russia"; the same goes for Iran. Nye writes that the expansion of the BRICS could bring in more "intra-organizational rivalries", limiting the groups' effectiveness. Melissa Pistilli writes that at the 2024 BRICS summit, President Putin seemed to back away from "aggressive calls for de-dollarization [...] but rather to deter the "weaponization" of the US dollar".

=== United Kingdom ===
After the August 2023 BRICS Summit, Con Coughlin—defense and foreign affairs editor at The Daily Telegraph—claimed "the challenge BRICS presents to the established world order seems destined to failure" and accused the organization of being used by China as a vehicle for expanding its global influence. Coughlin also noted the contradictions within the organization, such as the border dispute between China and India, and called for greater Western engagement with India as part of a new strategic alliance. In 2024, Jim O'Neill comments the grouping merely generates rhetoric and symbolism.

=== Global opinions ===
According to a Gallup International poll conducted between October and December 2023, almost a third of people around the world had never heard of BRICS, but Western countries were much more negative towards the alliance than elsewhere. The most negative attitudes were found in Sweden (45%), Spain (30%), the USA (30%), Portugal (29%), and Ukraine (29%) while the most positive net attitudes were in Russia (38%), Iran (37%), Nigeria (36%), Saudi Arabia (33%), and Malaysia (32%). In India, 36% had a positive view of BRICS while 29% had a negative view.

== Current leaders ==
Current leading member state representatives:

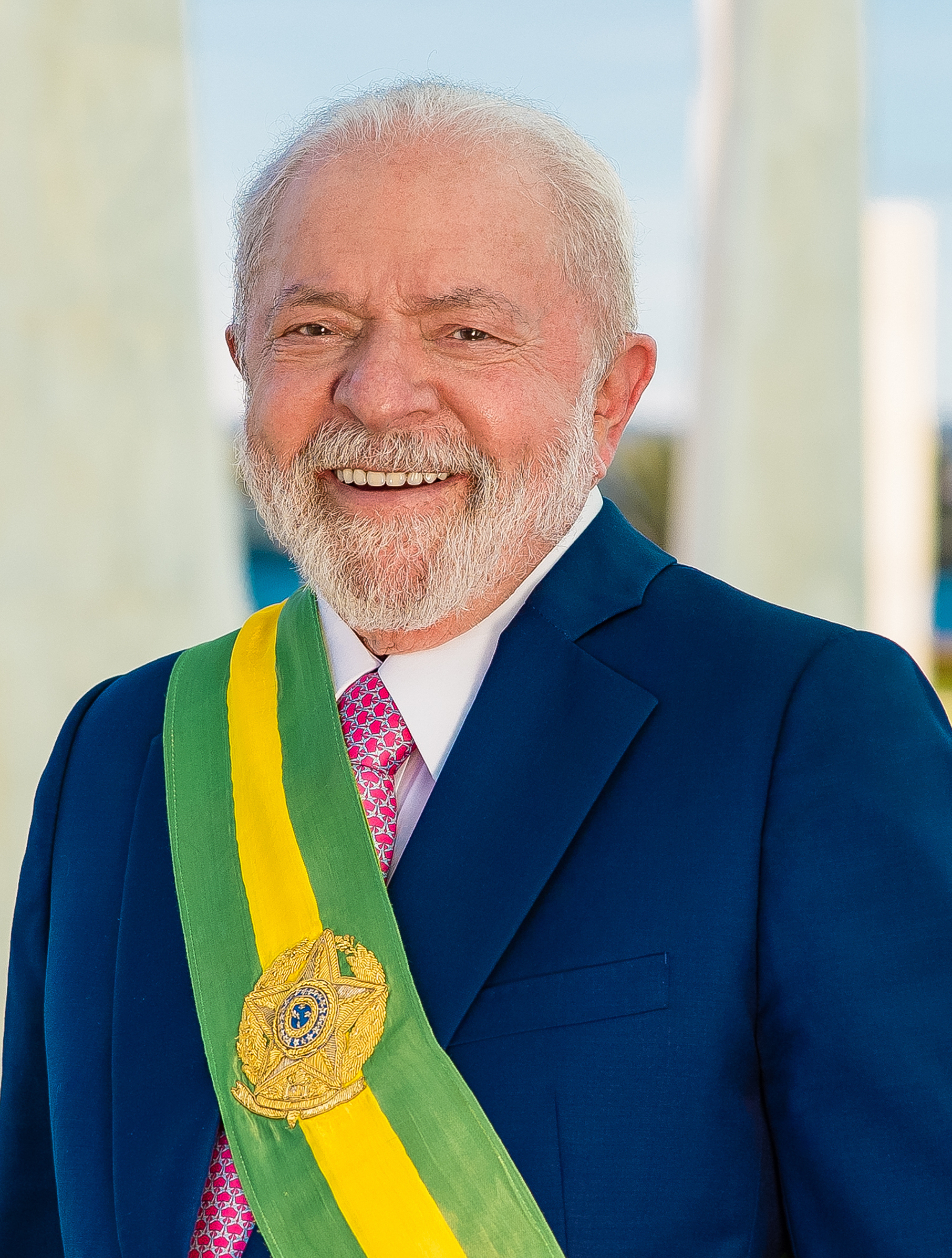
Lula da Silva
President of Brazil

Vladimir Putin
President of Russia

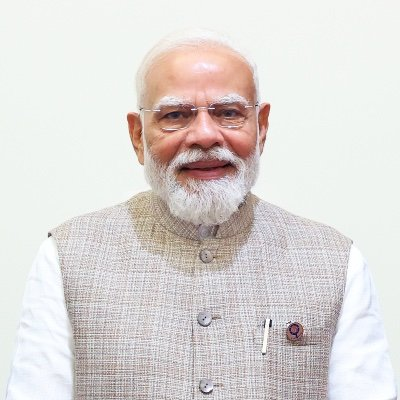
Narendra Modi
Prime Minister of India

Xi Jinping
President of China (Note: The General Secretary of the Chinese Communist Party is the top position in China, which is a one-party communist state.)

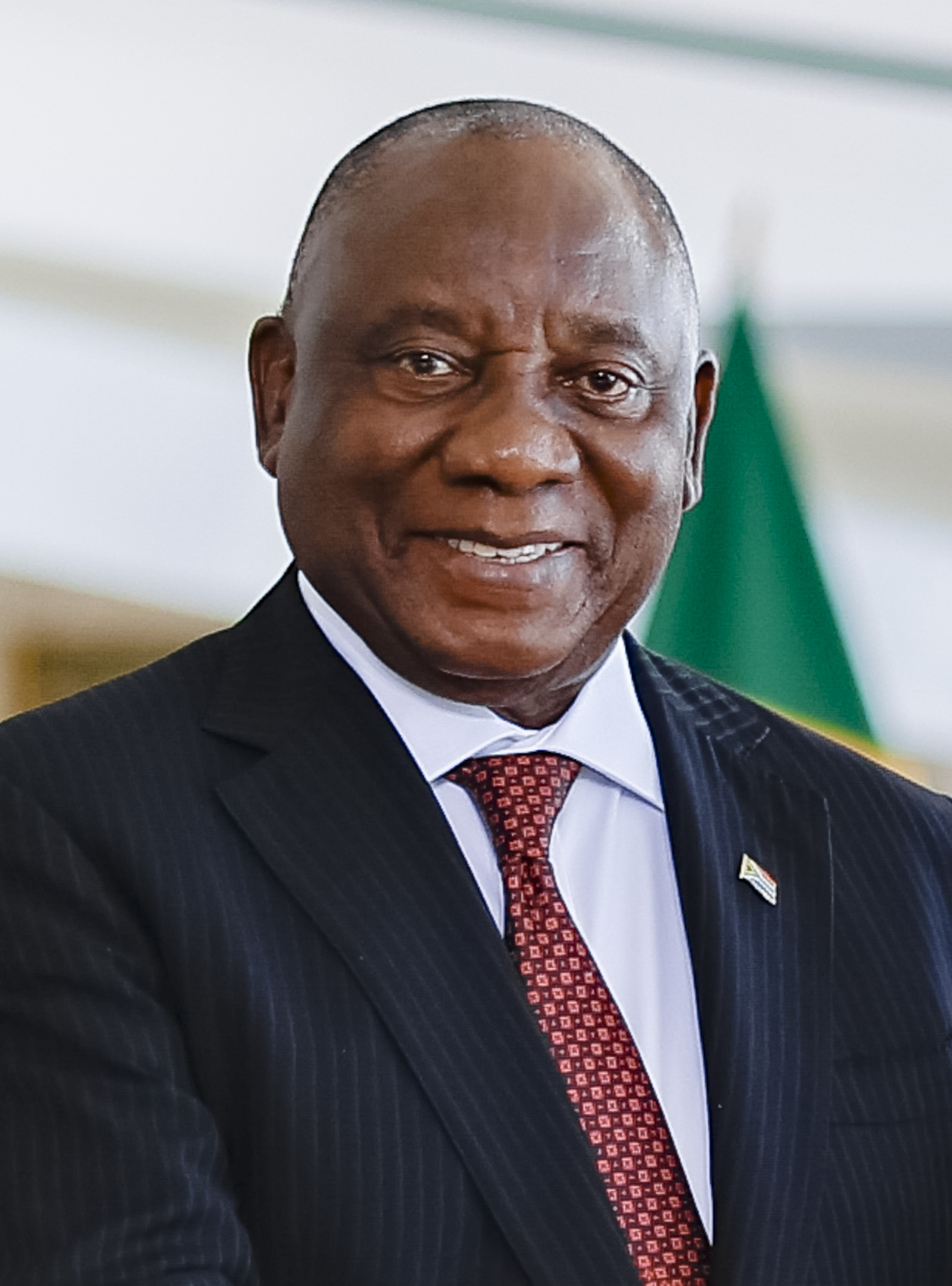
Cyril Ramaphosa
President of South Africa

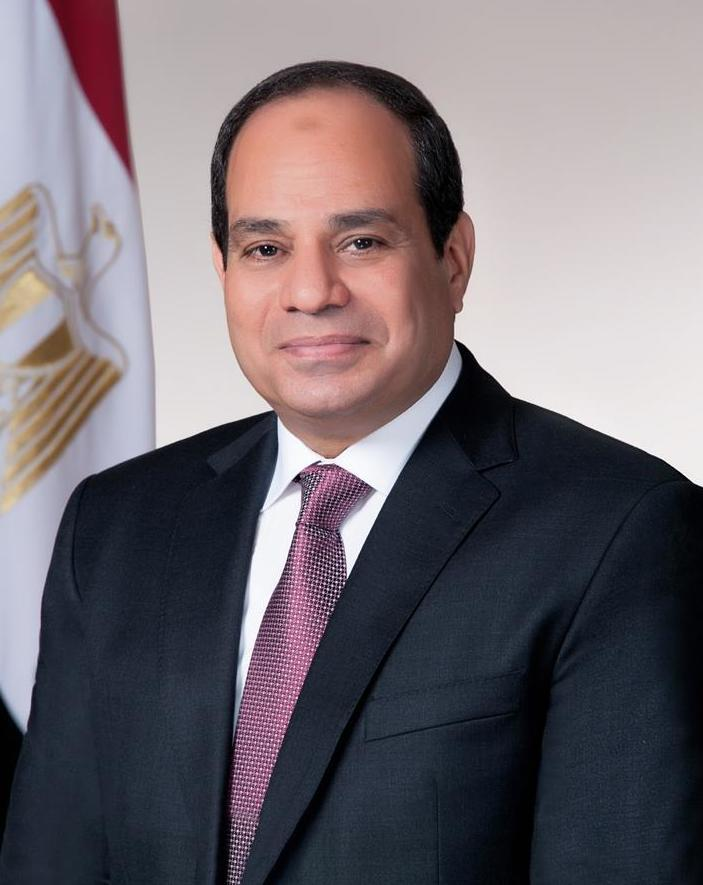
Abdel Fattah el-Sisi
President of Egypt

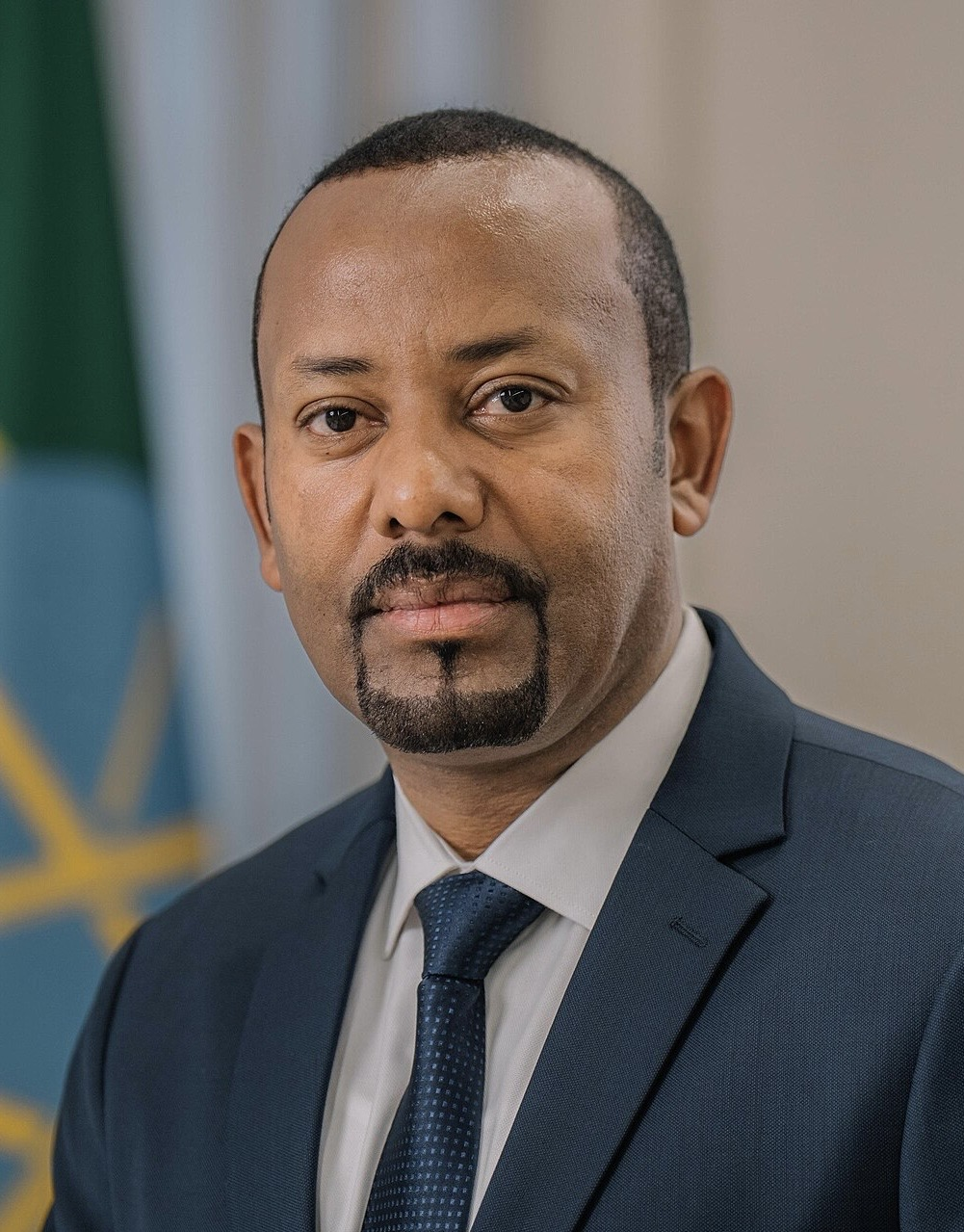
Abiy Ahmed
Prime Minister of Ethiopia

Prabowo Subianto
President of Indonesia

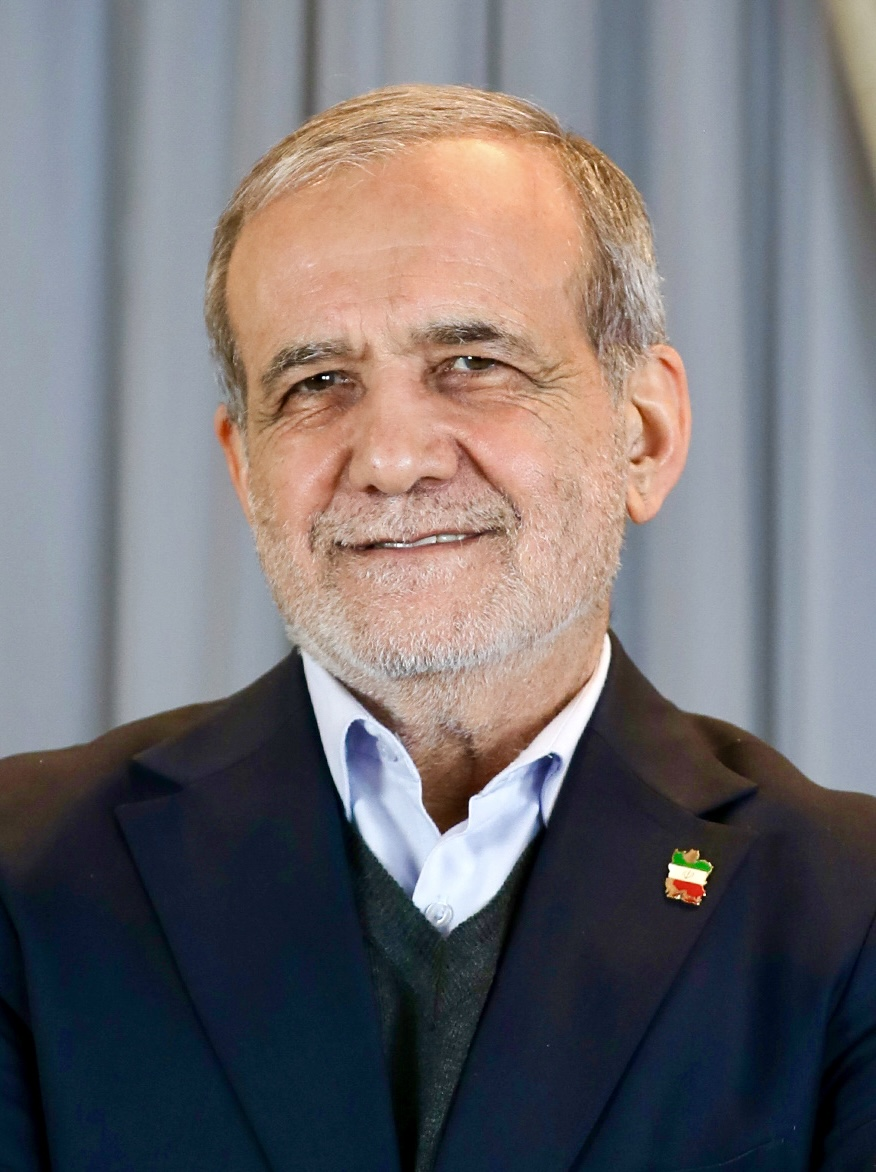
Masoud Pezeshkian
President of Iran (Note: The Supreme Leader is the top position in Iran, which is a theocratic Islamic republic.)

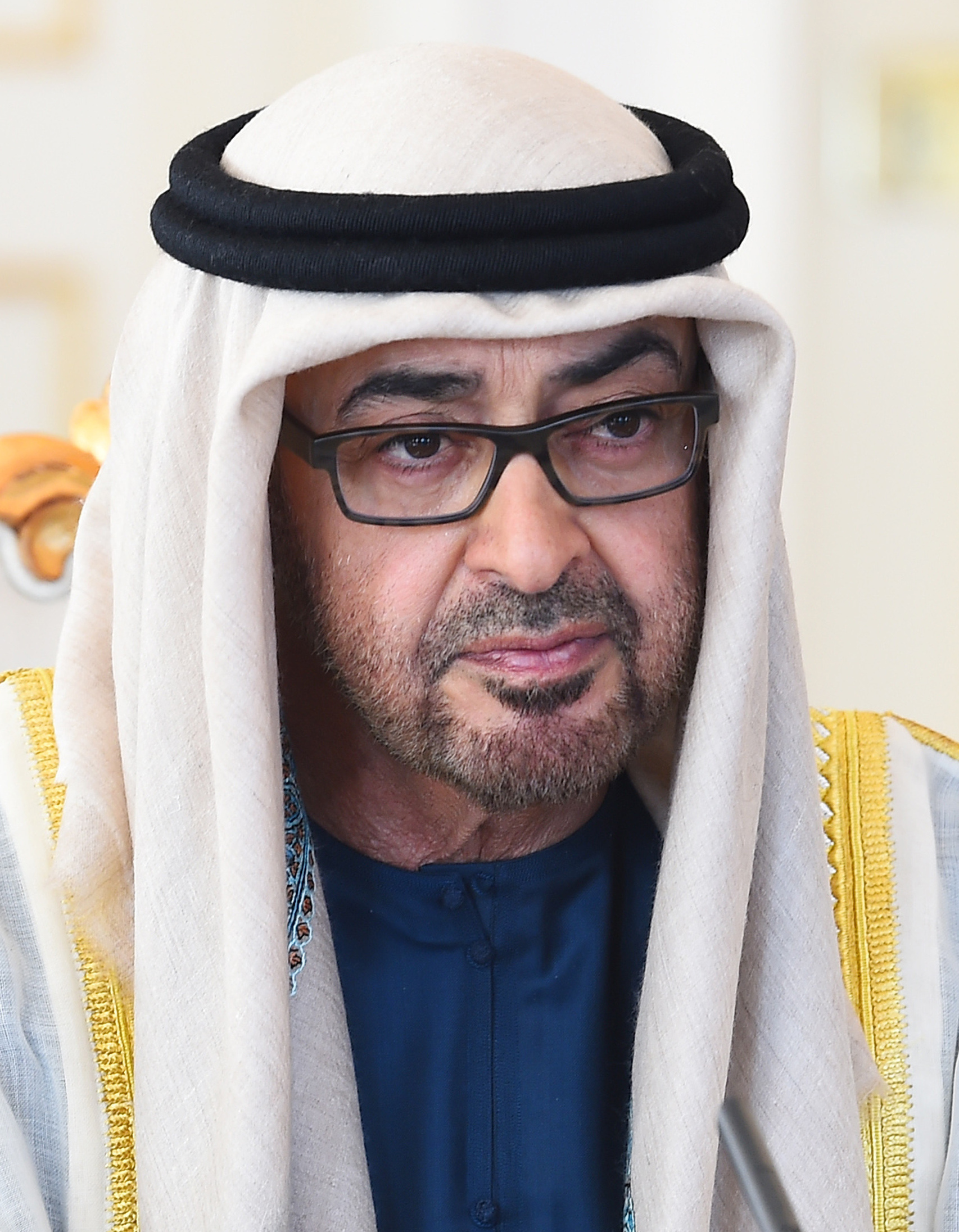
Mohamed bin Zayed Al Nahyan
President of the United Arab Emirates

== See also ==
- Belt and Road Initiative – Chinese global infrastructure project
- BRICS Games – Multi-sport event involving athletes from the BRICS+ Nations
- Developing country – Nation with a relatively low living standard
- East–West dichotomy – Perceived difference between the Eastern and Western worlds
- India–Middle East–Europe Economic Corridor – Economic corridor
- Emerging power – Nation or block with steadily rising influence in world affairs
- List of multilateral free-trade agreements – Free trade agreements list
- MIKTA – Informal partnership between Mexico, Indonesia, South Korea, Turkey and Australia
- G7 – Intergovernmental political and economic forum
- Potential superpowers – Globally dominant political entity
- Shanghai Cooperation Organisation – Eurasian multilateral security organisation
- ASEAN – Intergovernmental forum of Southeast Asian nations
- Mercosul – South American trade bloc
- BRICS PAY – Distributed payment messaging mechanism system
- G20 – Intergovernmental forum
- Hague Group – Group of states for the upholding of international law
- Member states of BRICS
- Non-Aligned Movement – Group of countries not in major power blocs
- OPEC – International petroleum organization
- List of BRICS summit attendees
- List of country groupings
- BRICS Contingent Reserve Arrangement
- BRICS Universities League – Consortium of research universities
- CRINK – China, Russia, Iran, & North Korea
- Axis of Resistance – Iran-led military coalition in West Asia
- Pix (payment system) – Brazilian instant payment platform
