= BRICS Contingent Reserve Arrangement =

International fiscal framework

The BRICS Contingent Reserve Arrangement (CRA) is a framework for the provision of support through liquidity and precautionary instruments in response to actual or potential short-term balance of payments pressures. It was established in 2015 by the BRICS countries: Brazil, Russia, India, China and South Africa. The legal basis is formed by the Treaty for the Establishment of a BRICS Contingent Reserve Arrangement, signed in Fortaleza, Brazil, on 15 July 2014. It entered into force upon ratification by all BRICS states, announced at the 7th BRICS summit in July 2015.

The objective of this reserve is to provide protection against global liquidity pressures. This includes currency issues where members' national currencies are being adversely affected by global financial pressures. The CRA is generally seen as a competitor to the International Monetary Fund (IMF) and along with the New Development Bank is viewed as an example of increasing South-South cooperation.

The CRA's "liquidity instrument" is the central bank liquidity swap. When a borrowing country ("Requesting Party") requests to draw funds, the central banks of the other countries ("Providing Parties") agree to sell and repurchase U.S. dollars with the borrowing country's central bank. Both the spot and forward legs of the swap are executed at the spot rate, however the borrowing country must pay a predetermined interest rate in dollars to the lending countries. The capital of $100 billion is distributed as follows: The maximum access states can request from the Arrangement is half (China) to twice (South Africa) the amount of capital contributed.

Country	Capital contribution (billion US$)	Access to Funds (billion US$)	Voting Rights (%)
Brazil	18	18	18.10
China	41	21	39.95
India	18	18	18.10
Russia	18	18	18.10
South Africa	5	10	5.75
Grand Total	100	85	100.00

The arrangement is scheduled to start lending in 2016.

In the years following its establishment, the CRA has continued to evolve as part of the BRICS' broader financial cooperation agenda. In 2020, BRICS finance ministers agreed to strengthen coordination between the CRA and the New Development Bank to improve crisis response capacity and streamline macroeconomic monitoring mechanisms. During the 2023 BRICS Summit in Johannesburg, member states reaffirmed the role of the CRA in providing a financial safety net amid global economic volatility and rising interest rates. The summit communiqué emphasized expanding the use of local currencies within the CRA framework and enhancing cooperation among central banks. In 2025, finance ministers announced that the CRA would begin developing digital tools for real-time liquidity monitoring and early-warning mechanisms for balance-of-payments stress, reflecting the group's focus on financial stability and digital transformation.

== See also ==
- BRICS PAY
- New Development Bank
