= Unit (currency) =

Currency system

Unit is a planned payment system for the BRICS+ countries based on a new international currency, backed by gold (40%) and different currencies (60%).

== History ==
The plans became public in 2022 with the war in Ukraine, after Western sanctions imposed since 2014 were significantly tightened and Russian banks were excluded from participating in the SWIFT payment system. Media, such as Al Jazeera, reported that Russian Finance Minister Anton Siluanov called for a new global payment system.

In March 2024, Yuri Ushakov, foreign policy advisor to Russian President Vladimir Putin, announced that a working group of the BRICS+ Business Council was working on concrete plans. The Unit Foundation is overseeing the project. The Unit is not a cryptocurrency, but rather a benchmark token—or index token—backed by real assets: 40% gold by weight, not by nominal value, and 60% in the national currencies of the BRICS+ nations. Major bank JP Morgan called The Unit “perhaps the most thoroughly developed de-dollarization proposal in the area of cross-border transactions for BRICS+.” However, other voices doubted the viability of the project.
