= 12th BRICS summit =

2020 international summit hosted by Russia

2020 BRICS summit 12th BRICS summit
- 17 November 2020 (video conference); ~~21–23 July 2020~~ (postponed due to COVID-19 pandemic)
- Host country: Russia
- Motto: BRICS Partnership for Global Stability, Shared Security and Innovative Growth
- Cities: Saint Petersburg
- Participants: Brazil; Russia; India; China; South Africa
- Chair: Vladimir Putin, President of Russia

The 2020 BRICS summit was the twelfth annual BRICS summit, an international relations conference attended by the heads of state or heads of government of the five member states Brazil, Russia, India, China and South Africa. The meeting was originally scheduled to take place in Saint Petersburg from July 21 to 23, 2020, but was changed to a video conference held on November 17 due to the outbreak of the global COVID-19 pandemic.

Russia last chaired 7th BRICS summit, Ufa. The 1st Sherpa meeting was held in Saint Petersburg between 11 and 13 February 2020, under chairmanship of Sergei Ryabkov, Deputy Minister of Foreign Affairs of the Russian Federation and Russian Sherpa for BRICS.

== Participating leaders ==
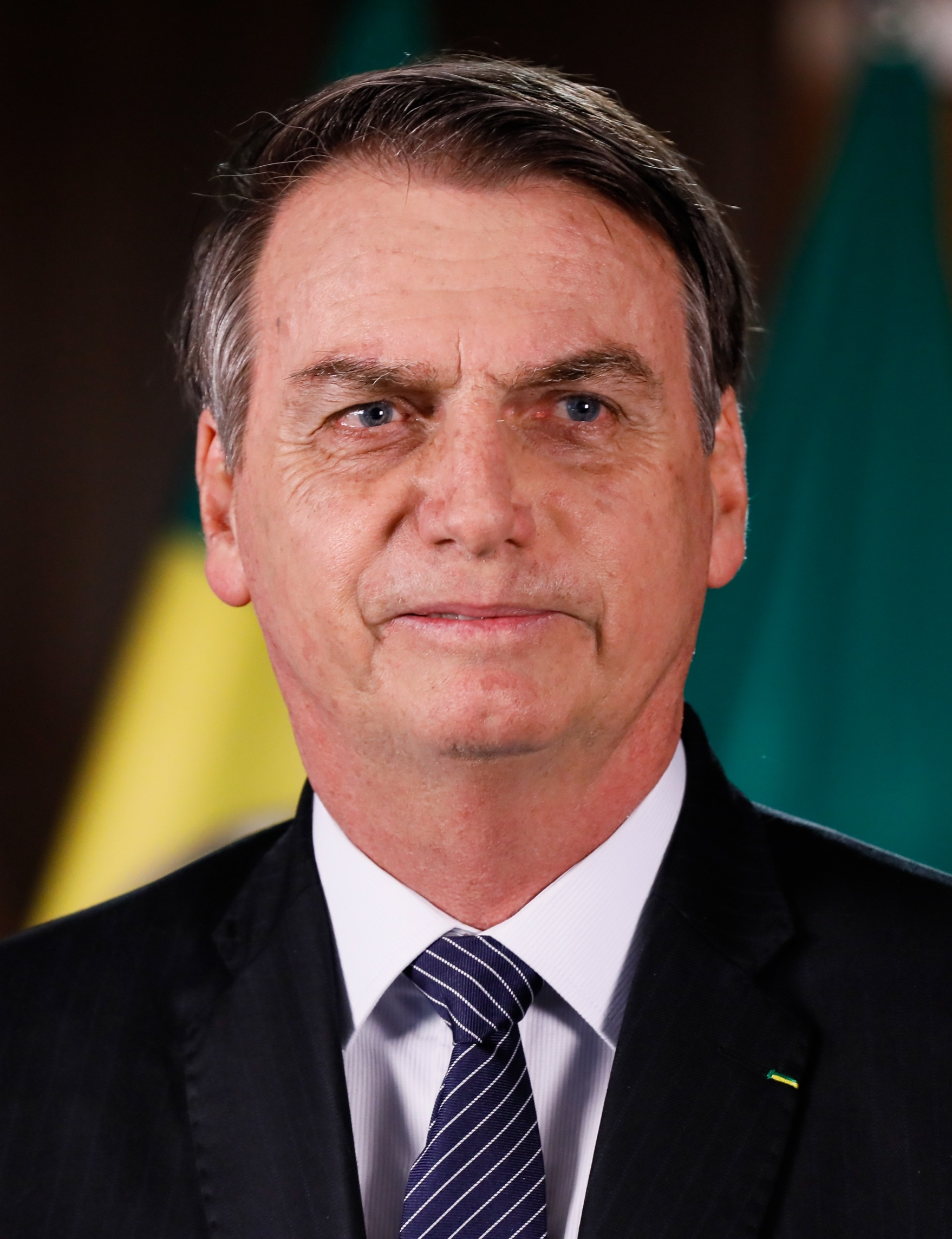
Brazil
Jair Bolsonaro, President

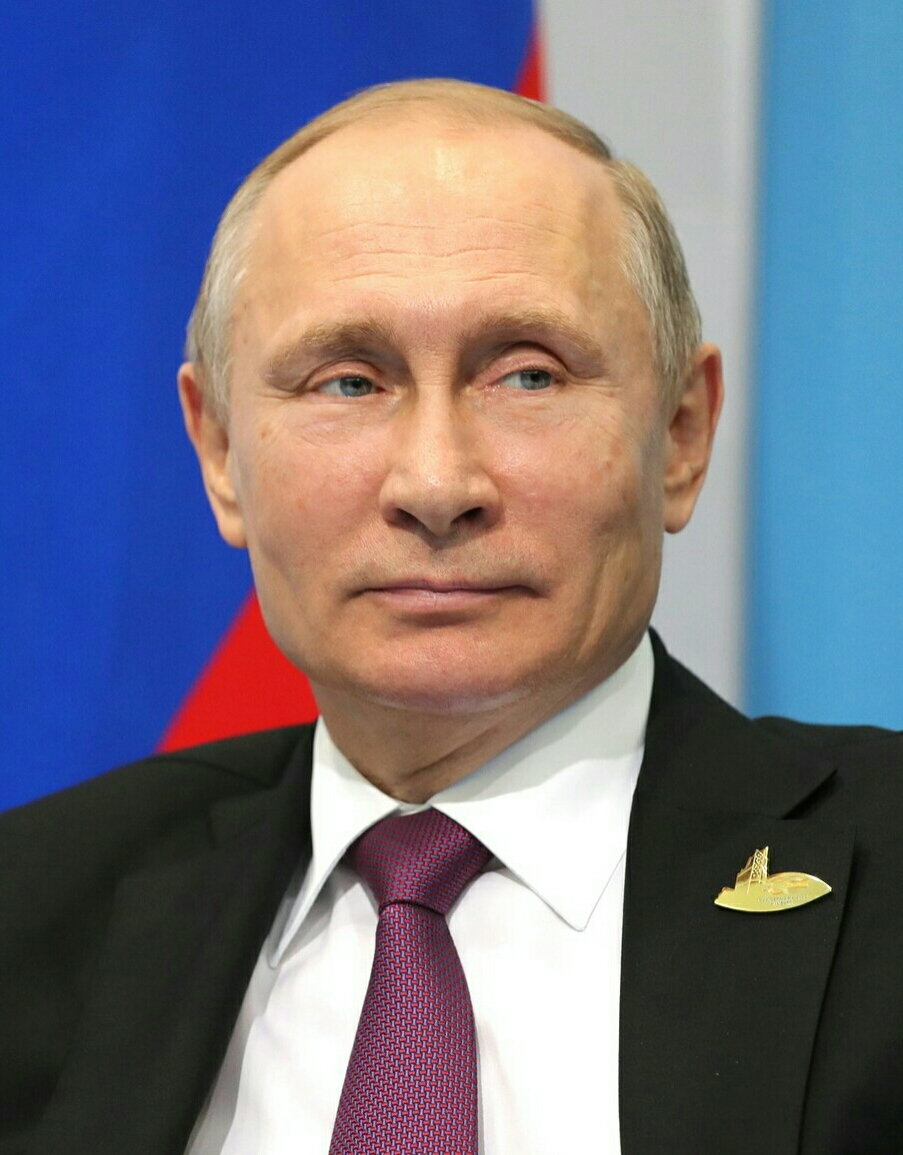
Russia
Vladimir Putin, President (Host)

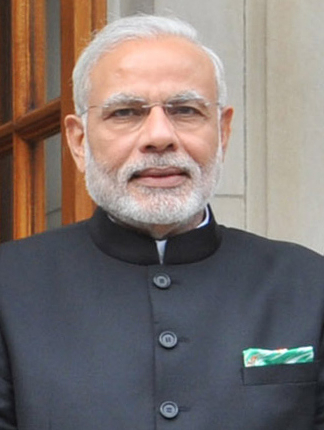
India
Narendra Modi, Prime Minister

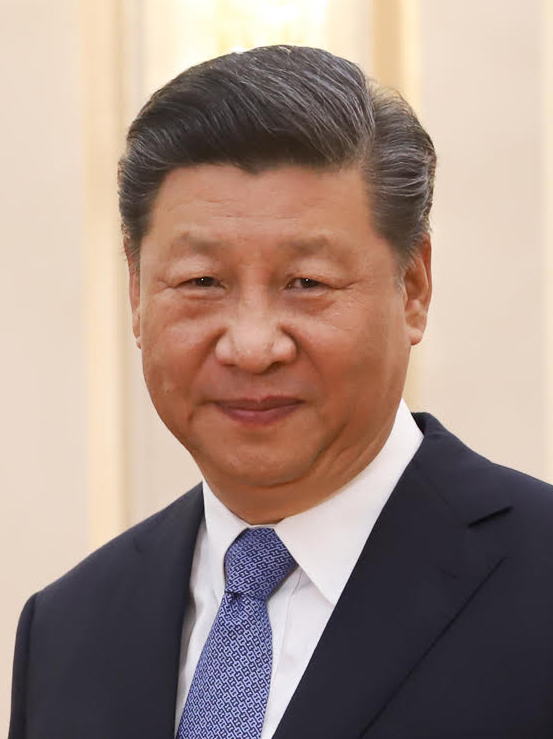
China
Xi Jinping, CCP General Secretary
President

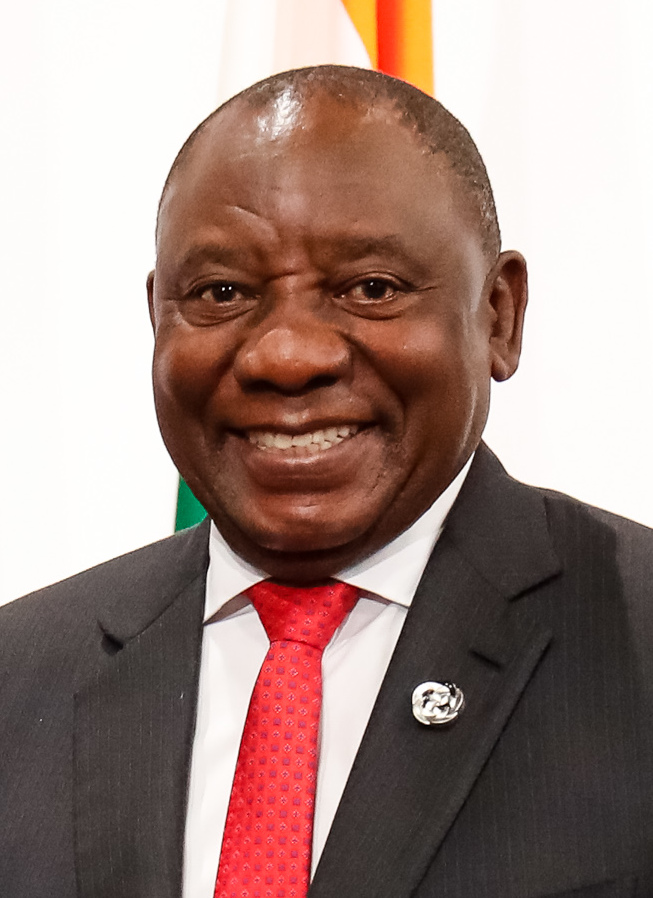
South Africa
Cyril Ramaphosa, President
