= List of countries by informal employment rate =

The following article lists countries by the share of informal employment in total employment. Informal employment, as defined by the International Labour Organization (ILO), refers to work arrangements that lack legal protection, social security benefits, and employment rights. It typically occurs in the unregulated or unprotected sector of the economy, where workers often lack formal contracts, job stability, and access to benefits such as paid leave, healthcare, and retirement plans. Informal employment is characterized by its casual nature, low wages, limited job security, and often involves self-employment or work in small, unregistered businesses. Worldwide, over 60% of workers are in informal employment. Informal employment differs significantly in different world regions. In Africa, 85.8% of employment falls under the informal sector, while in Asia and the Pacific, it accounts for 68.2%. The Arab States follows closely with 68.6%, while in the Americas, the proportion is 40.0%. Europe and Central Asia demonstrate the lowest prevalence of informal employment at 25.1%.

== Ranking ==
Countries by share of the labour force in informal employment.

Country	Share of informal employment (%)			Year
Country	Total	Male	Female	Year
Niger	98.49	97.95	99.01	2022
Burundi	98.31	97.39	99.05	2014
Chad	96.92	95.23	98.99	2018
DR Congo	96.76	95.74	97.82	2020
Benin	96.35	94.38	98.16	2022
Madagascar	96.08	95.67	96.55	2022
Mozambique	95.67	92.66	98.39	2015
Mali	95.42	94.24	97.42	2022
Uganda	95.15	93.08	97.35	2021
Guinea-Bissau	94.77	92.19	97.39	2022
Sudan	94.41	94.87	92.26	2022
Burkina Faso	93.76	91.56	96.01	2024
Tanzania	93.58	91.11	96.08	2020
Nigeria	93.18	89.92	96.39	2024
Sierra Leone	93.11	89.28	96.63	2018
Togo	92.34	90.64	93.87	2022
Angola	92.21	88.84	95.44	2022
Ivory Coast	92.13	89.24	95.45	2022
Haiti	91.61	89.25	94.71	2012
Laos	90.49	89.47	91.60	2022
Liberia	89.66	85.71	93.69	2017
Cambodia	89.41	89.81	88.98	2019
Mauritania	89.36	88.16	91.70	2019
Senegal	89.24	87.58	92.36	2024
Lesotho	89.14	88.55	89.90	2024
Comoros	88.81	86.66	91.60	2021
India	88.36	86.76	91.93	2024
Zimbabwe	88.07	85.33	90.93	2023
Cameroon	87.10	82.78	91.67	2014
Malawi	87.08	83.20	90.93	2013
Kenya	86.49	83.13	90.19	2019
Afghanistan	86.13	82.63	97.30	2021
Congo	85.28	88.35	82.87	2009
Ethiopia	85.21	83.58	87.45	2021
Pakistan	84.34	82.21	91.72	2021
Rwanda	84.27	82.17	86.67	2024
Bangladesh	84.19	78.08	95.77	2023
Gambia	84.13	78.45	89.45	2023
Bolivia	83.88	81.89	86.05	2024
Zambia	83.83	80.15	88.11	2023
Guatemala	83.19	81.22	85.97	2023
Honduras	82.61	83.61	80.99	2017
Somalia	82.49	81.12	85.53	2019
Nicaragua	81.79	81.31	82.38	2012
Nepal	81.56	77.97	87.34	2017
Indonesia	81.19	80.12	82.84	2023
Myanmar	80.96	78.59	84.37	2020
Timor-Leste	80.59	78.59	83.56	2021
Ghana	78.05	77.21	78.79	2015
Yemen	77.41	77.05	82.17	2014
Botswana	75.58	78.44	72.55	2024
Vanuatu	72.40	71.22	73.84	2019
Peru	72.07	70.24	74.31	2024
Egypt	71.33	73.29	62.48	2023
Ecuador	68.64	67.08	70.88	2024
Vietnam	67.66	70.19	64.92	2023
Iraq	67.64	70.54	45.43	2021
Paraguay	67.31	66.48	68.43	2024
Sri Lanka	67.04	71.21	58.96	2022
El Salvador	66.50	64.25	69.45	2023
Tajikistan	64.58	68.72	53.84	2016
Cape Verde	63.82	63.74	63.90	2015
Thailand	63.33	64.17	62.36	2024
Barbados	61.97	63.40	60.56	2016
Kiribati	61.61	64.06	58.51	2023
Tonga	58.86	60.53	56.80	2023
Kyrgyzstan	58.76	61.94	53.80	2023
Panama	58.69	60.67	55.90	2024
Venezuela	58.34	61.19	54.12	2017
Colombia	56.14	57.91	53.65	2024
Namibia	55.76	53.18	58.32	2018
Georgia	55.63	56.95	54.15	2020
Mexico	55.53	55.66	55.34	2025
Lebanon	55.45	55.39	55.59	2019
Jordan	55.12	57.70	42.66	2023
Dominican Republic	54.70	58.61	49.24	2024
Jamaica	54.64	63.51	44.24	2023
Eswatini	53.30	50.31	56.36	2023
Moldova	52.22	52.11	52.32	2024
Suriname	52.11	56.36	45.68	2016
Argentina	51.58	51.29	51.93	2024
Samoa	51.58	57.22	41.26	2022
Guyana	51.17	56.42	43.45	2019
Djibouti	50.52	45.72	64.88	2017
Palestine	48.48	50.61	39.59	2024
Maldives	48.15	45.23	52.04	2019
Grenada	48.05	57.16	36.50	2023
Nauru	47.97	49.84	45.54	2021
Armenia	47.88	48.41	47.30	2017
Fiji	45.70	49.88	37.34	2024
Mongolia	41.94	45.97	37.20	2023
Cook Islands	40.34	42.41	38.23	2023
Costa Rica	37.38	36.87	38.17	2024
Tunisia	36.91	39.30	30.32	2019
Brazil	36.50	37.95	34.59	2024
Wallis and Futuna	35.99	45.11	23.25	2019
South Africa	34.90	35.11	34.65	2024
Mauritius	33.91	37.98	28.01	2023
Marshall Islands	33.08	29.30	39.71	2021
Uruguay	28.55	29.55	27.32	2024
Brunei	28.48	29.23	27.34	2023
Saint Lucia	28.12	35.62	19.24	2024
Turkey	27.71	24.15	34.89	2024
Chile	27.46	26.09	29.28	2024
South Korea	26.62	23.58	31.03	2019
Tuvalu	20.23	20.86	19.25	2022
Bosnia and Herzegovina	19.67	16.29	24.58	2023
Russia	19.33	19.82	18.82	2024
Antigua and Barbuda	19.26	23.62	14.85	2023
Bahamas	18.36	20.54	16.01	2019
Serbia	17.81	16.40	19.46	2024
Seychelles	14.22	23.02	5.84	2024
North Macedonia	11.09	13.30	8.11	2024
Poland	8.62	7.80	9.54	2024
Palau	7.27	7.14	7.45	2023
United Kingdom	6.51	5.23	7.92	2018
Portugal	4.73	4.27	5.20	2024
Slovakia	4.37	5.55	2.98	2024
Greece	3.58	2.58	4.90	2024
Italy	3.42	3.08	3.89	2024
Lithuania	3.20	3.25	3.15	2024
France	3.15	3.00	3.31	2024
Sweden	2.83	2.95	2.69	2024
Denmark	2.82	2.75	2.89	2019
Netherlands	2.63	1.99	3.33	2024
Germany	2.49	2.30	2.71	2022
Estonia	2.40	2.48	2.33	2024
Czech Republic	2.26	1.10	3.66	2024
Romania	2.21	1.89	2.63	2024
Spain	2.20	1.49	3.02	2024
Finland	2.19	2.06	2.31	2024
Latvia	2.17	1.63	2.66	2024
Iceland	1.97	1.52	2.48	2020
Luxembourg	1.93	2.12	1.71	2024
Ireland	1.90	1.69	2.14	2024
Cyprus	1.68	1.04	2.39	2024
Norway	1.43	1.67	1.14	2024
Belgium	1.37	0.83	1.95	2024
Austria	1.33	1.41	1.23	2024
Hungary	1.31	0.94	1.74	2020
Bulgaria	1.20	0.86	1.58	2024
Croatia	1.17	0.62	1.79	2024
Switzerland	1.14	0.52	1.83	2023
Slovenia	0.70	0.67	0.72	2024
Malta	0.63	0.58	0.70	2020
