= Mir Pay =

Contactless payment service in Russia

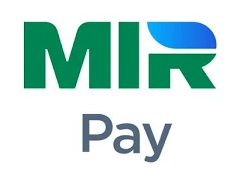
- Developer: JSC "NSPK"
- Release: March 2019; 7 years ago
- Stable release: 1.56.5.350 / July 25, 2025; 12 months ago
- Written in: Kotlin
- Operating system: Android 7.0 and later
- Platform: Android
- Available in: Russian
- Type: Contactless payment service
- Website: vamprivet.ru/mirpay/

Mir Pay is a Russian contactless payment service for smartphones. It was developed as part of the digital transformation of Russia's financial market and has been described as a significant event on the domestic Russian market.

== History ==
In April 2018, the National Payment Card System (NSPK) began developing its own contactless payment app, Mir Pay. Development of the mobile payment app was carried out only for the Android platform. The development was initiated after the brief March 2014 blocking of Visa and Mastercard in Russia. and was identified as an important step in ensuring Russia's "financial independence", along with the Mir card system. According to an article in the Science and Art of Management journal, the absence of this domestic service could have led to "significant disruptions in the economic and social area," as most citizens had previously used Western-system cards to receive salaries, pensions, and other social benefits.

The first version of the Mir Pay app was released on March 1, 2019. Starting March 4, 2019, the app became available for download on app distribution platforms. The first 8 banks to join the system were: Rosselkhozbank, RNCB, Center-invest Bank, SMP Bank, Bank Rossiya, Ural Bank for Reconstruction and Development, Credit Bank of Moscow, and Promsvyazbank. On June 21, 2021, Sberbank joined the Mir Pay system.

In August 2021, the Mir Pay app, based on Huawei Mobile Services, appeared on the Huawei AppGallery platform.

On August 5, 2022, the Mir Pay system began operating in Belarus.

The system became widespread after the Western payment services were blocked in Russia in March of 2022. On September 1, 2022, the press service of the "Mir" system reported that the number of Mir Pay users had increased 20-fold over the year.

== Features ==
The service is noted as having both advantages and disadvantages for users.

=== Advantages ===
The primary advantages of "Mir Pay" include:

- Convenience
- Security
- General accessibility within Russia
- Access to various bonus programs

=== Limitations ===
The service also has several noted limitations:

- Limited international support
- A dependency on the availability of special equipment for contactless payment
- Incompatibility with some devices, specifically noting Apple products
- Periodic technical failures

== Adoption ==
As of the end of 2024, the "Mir Pay" service was "actively growing" and was available to the clients of 176 Russian banks. Its growth is linked to the wide adoption of the underlying "Mir" card system, which exceeded 314 million issued cards by the first quarter of 2024.

== See also ==
- Mir (payment system)
- Fast Payment System
- Digital ruble

== Sources ==
- Kirsanov, Vitaly Yu. (2025). "Развитие платежной инфраструктуры российского финансового рынка в условиях цифровой трансформации" [Payment infrastructure development of the Russian financial market in the context of digital transformation]. Наука и искусство управления / Вестник Института экономики, управления и права Российского государственного гуманитарного университета [Science and Art of Management / Bulletin of the Institute of Economics, Management and Law of the Russian State University for the Humanities] (in Russian) (3): 52–64. ISSN 2782-2222.
- "Платёжная система «Мир» планирует создать сервис бесконтактной оплаты «Мир Pay»" [Payment system "Mir" plans to create contactless payment service "Mir Pay"] (in Russian). TASS. April 13, 2018. Archived from the original on 2018-12-19.
- "Система «Мир» запустила национальный аналог Apple Pay" [Mir system launched a national analogue of Apple Pay] (in Russian). RBC. March 4, 2019. Archived from the original on 2019-03-04.
- "Mir Pay стал доступен держателям карт «Мир» СберБанка" [Mir Pay became available to Sberbank "Mir" card holders]. www.sberbank.ru (in Russian). Sberbank. June 21, 2021. Archived from the original on 2021-07-20.
- "Мобильный платежный сервис Mir Pay стал доступен в Белоруссии" [Mobile payment service Mir Pay became available in Belarus] (in Russian). Interfax. August 5, 2022. Archived from the original on 2022-08-05.
- "Число пользователей Mir Pay выросло в 20 раз за год" [Number of Mir Pay users grew 20-fold in a year] (in Russian). Prime. September 1, 2022. Archived from the original on 2022-09-01.
