= SBPay =

Contactless payment service in Russia

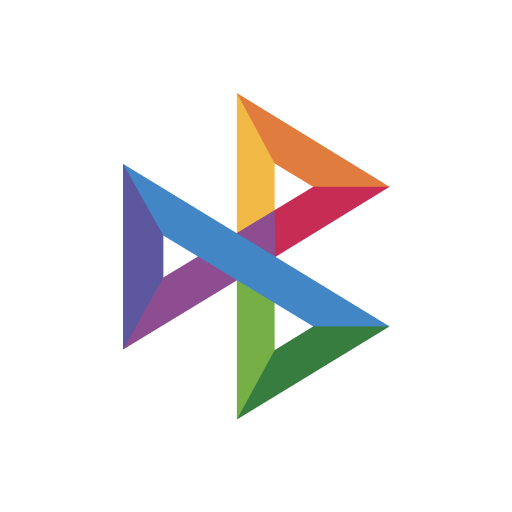
- Developer: Russian National Card Payment System
- Initial release: 2021; 5 years ago
- Operating system: Android; iOS
- License: Proprietary
- Website: sbp.nspk.ru/sbpay/

SBPay is a Russian contactless payment service for smartphones based on the Bank of Russia's Faster Payment System (FPS). It was developed by the Russian National Card Payment System (NSPK) and launched in April 2021 as a mobile app for paying for goods and services in retail stores and online using FPS-supported payment methods.

Russian media have described it as a prospective analog to cashless payment services like Google Pay and Apple Pay, which became unavailable in Russia due to 2022 sanctions.

== History ==
The Bank of Russia justified the introduction of the SBPay app as a way to minimize costs for Russian credit institutions in developing their own mobile apps and to enhance competition in the payment services market.

The SBPay system was launched by NSPK in April 2021 as a mobile app for paying for goods and services in retail stores and online using Faster Payment System-supported methods (QR code, website button, payment link). Later, the app also added contactless NFC-based payments.

By order of the Bank of Russia, all FPS-participating banks were required to enable SBPay payments for customers starting April 1, 2022 (later postponed to July 1, 2022). By March 2022, around 100 Russian banks had integrated SBPay. As of October 31, 2022, 171 Russian banks had joined the SBPay service; among the 13 systemically important banks, only Alfa-Bank had not integrated it.

In October 2024, NSPK presented its proprietary payment technology solution "Volna" (Russian: Волна) as part of the SBPay app. The solution enables contactless purchases for Android and iOS smartphone users via Bluetooth. It can be embedded into a payment service or mobile banking app.

== See also ==
- SberPay
- Digital ruble
