= Digital ruble =

Central bank digital currency of Russia

Digital ruble Цифровой рубль
- Digital ruble logo

ISO 4217
- Code: RUB (numeric: 643)
- Subunit: 0.01

Units of account
- Base unit: ruble
- Plural: rubles
- Symbol: or ₽
- Subunit
- 1/100: kopeyka

Demographics
- Date of introduction: Legal framework: 1 August 2023; Pilot launch: 15 August 2023; 3 years ago; Commercial rollout: 1 September 2026
- User(s): Russia

Issuance
- Central bank: Central Bank of Russia
- Website: www.cbr.ru/eng/
- Printer: Central Bank of Russia
- Website: www.cbr.ru/fintech/dr/

Valuation
- Pegged with: (Russia) Russian ruble (at par)
- Value: 1 USD ≈ 83–86 digital rubles 1 EUR ≈ 90–93 digital rubles 1 RUB = 1.00 digital ruble (September 2026)

The digital ruble (Russian: цифровой рубль, romanized: tsifrovoy rubl') is a central bank digital currency (CBDC) issued by the Central Bank of Russia (Bank of Russia). It represents the third official form of the Russian national currency alongside cash and commercial bank deposits, with all forms legally equivalent and exchangeable at par.

The platform is operated directly by the Bank of Russia, while commercial credit institutions act as intermediaries providing account access through mobile banking applications. Real-money pilot testing began on 15 August 2023, followed by legislation enacting a mandatory phased commercial rollout starting on 1 September 2026.

== Platform design and rules ==
The digital ruble operates under a two-tier distribution architecture. The Bank of Russia operates the core platform, issues the currency, and maintains the central ledger, which combines a centralized database with distributed ledger components and Russian GOST cryptographic standards certified by state authorities. Commercial banks act as client-facing distributors, conducting KYC and anti-money laundering checks and integrating wallet management into their mobile banking interfaces.

The Bank of Russia structured operational limits to emphasize the currency's role as a settlement channel rather than a savings vehicle. Individual users may top up their digital wallets by up to ₽300,000 per month from standard bank accounts, while corporate accounts have no top-up ceiling. All consumer transactions, including peer-to-peer transfers and retail purchases, are free of charge. For businesses, merchant acquiring fees are capped at 0.3% per transaction (maximum ₽1,500), and 0.2% for utility, housing, and government payments (maximum ₽10). By law, digital wallet balances do not accrue interest, and credit or overdraft services in digital rubles are prohibited.

The platform includes smart contract functionality through the Platform of Commercial Smart Contracts (PCSC), allowing businesses to execute automated conditional settlements and enabling government agencies to allocate earmarked budget subsidies that can only be spent on designated merchant categories. Point-of-sale retail transactions are processed through a universal QR code standard managed by the National Payment Card System (NSPK).

== History ==
=== Development (2017–2021) ===
Exploratory discussions on a sovereign digital currency began in late 2017 amid the expansion of private cryptocurrencies, initially centered on a government draft proposal for a "cryptoruble."

In October 2020, the Bank of Russia released a formal consultation paper on the development of a CBDC, ruling out decentralized cryptocurrency models in favor of a centralized sovereign obligation. In April 2021, the regulator adopted the two-tier retail model. In June 2021, it selected 12 commercial banks for initial prototype testing, including Ak Bars Bank, Alfa-Bank, Gazprombank, Promsvyazbank, Rosbank, Sberbank, T-Bank, Transcapitalbank, and VTB Bank.

=== Pilot testing (2022–2025) ===
Testing of the prototype platform began in January 2022, with the first peer-to-peer transfers between test client accounts completed on 15 February 2022.

On 24 July 2023, President Vladimir Putin signed Federal Law No. 340-FZ, establishing the legal status of the digital ruble and designating the Bank of Russia as platform operator, taking effect on 1 August 2023. On 15 August 2023, real-money pilot operations launched across 11 cities with an initial group of 13 commercial banks, testing account opening, wallet funding, transfers, and point-of-sale QR purchases.

Between 2024 and 2025, the pilot scope expanded to include corporate B2B settlements, dynamic QR codes, and smart-contract execution. By mid-2025, pilot operations encompassed 15 financial institutions, several thousand active corporate and individual accounts, and transactions across more than 150 localities.

=== Mandatory rollout (2025–2026) ===
On 23 July 2025, the Russian parliament enacted Federal Law No. 248-FZ, setting a binding timetable for widespread adoption. Under this statute, the digital ruble was integrated into the federal budget execution process on 1 January 2026 for state procurement and social benefit distributions.

On 1 September 2026, the first mandatory phase took effect, requiring all 12 systemically important credit institutions and retail enterprises with annual revenues exceeding ₽120 million to provide digital ruble settlement capabilities. The law scheduled subsequent implementation phases for 1 September 2027, covering banks with universal licenses and businesses with revenues above ₽30 million, and 1 September 2028 for remaining financial institutions and smaller merchants (with businesses generating under ₽5 million annually remaining exempt).

== Reception and debates ==
=== Banking sector reaction ===
During the design phase, commercial banks, led by Sberbank, expressed concern regarding deposit disintermediation. Sberbank analysts warned that an estimated migration of ₽2 to ₽4 trillion from standard bank accounts into central bank digital wallets could tighten liquidity and raise commercial lending rates.

Lenders also noted that the capped 0.3% merchant acquiring rate would compress revenue derived from standard card interchange fees (typically 1.5% to 2.5%), reducing the funding available for customer loyalty and cashback programs.

=== Public response ===
Independent consumer surveys conducted during early pilot phases indicated public skepticism. An August 2023 survey by Mail.ru reported that 12% of respondents planned to use the digital ruble, with respondents citing satisfaction with the existing Faster Payment System (SBP), the lack of deposit interest, and the absence of reward incentives. Privacy advocates also raised concerns that direct central bank account administration could enable real-time monitoring and administrative freezing of consumer assets by state authorities.

=== International trade and sanctions ===
Following the expansion of Western financial sanctions and the disconnection of Russian banks from SWIFT in 2022, Russian authorities accelerated CBDC implementation as an instrument for cross-border settlements. The Bank of Russia explored integrating its platform with sovereign digital currencies of trade partners, particularly within the BRICS framework, to settle bilateral transactions outside Western clearing channels.

== See also ==
- Central bank digital currency
- Digital renminbi
- Digital rupee
- Faster Payment System (Russia)
- Mir (payment system)
- SPFS
