= SberPay =

Contactless payment service in Russia

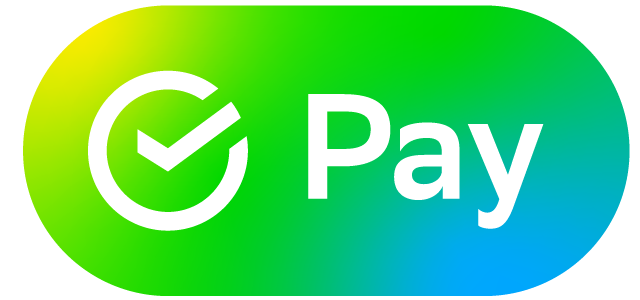
- Developer: Sberbank
- Release: 2020; 6 years ago
- Operating system: Android; iOS
- License: Proprietary
- Website: www.sberbank.ru/ru/person/payments/sberpay

SberPay is a Russian contactless payment service for smartphones developed by Sberbank. A system designed for contactless payment using Mir payment system cards via a smartphone with NFC technology.

== History ==
The service was launched on July 9, 2020. SberPay enables payments for purchases both online and offline. Payments can be made through the Sberbank Online mobile app.

Starting April 13, 2022, the service became unavailable for "Mir" card payments. Sberbank stated that the suspension was due to a "decision by the technical partner". In November, Sberbank restored the service's operation.

On August 25, 2025, Sberbank launched contactless payments on iPhone via Bluetooth Low Energy under the name "Vzuh" (Russian: Вжух). Payments are processed from a bank card through the SberPay system.

== See also ==
- Faster Payment System
- Digital ruble
