= Russian National Commercial Bank =

Russian bank mostly operating in Crimea

- Native name: Российский национальный коммерческий банк
- Type: Public Joint Stock Company
- Industry: Financial services
- Founded: January 25, 1991
- Defunct: 2025
- Fate: Merged
- Successor: VTB bank
- Headquarters: Simferopol, Russia
- Area served: Crimea
- Products: Banking services
- Total assets: 127,706,874,000 Russian ruble (2017)
- Total equity: RUB 21.8 billion (2017)
- Owner: VTB Bank
- Rating: А(RU)
- Website: www.rncb.ru

Russian National Commercial Bank (Russian: Российский национальный коммерческий банк; Ukrainian: Російський національний комерційний банк; Crimean Tatar: Русие миллий тиджарет банкы) was a bank that operated primarily in Crimea. In June 2025, the RNCB was announced to have merged into the VTB bank. The process of merging RNCB with VTB began in June 2024, and from June 12, 2025, VTB bank serviced the former RNCB clients.

The bank took over numerous branches of banks that had withdrawn from Crimea following the 2014 Russia's Annexation. While the bank had no branches in operation as of January 2014, it had over 200 branches by 2015, making it the most widespread bank in Crimea.

Originally a subsidiary of VTB, it was acquired by the Crimean government weeks after the peninsula was annexed by Russia. Despite the severing of formal ties with the VTB Group, the bank was considered to operate as a front of VTB Group’s business operations in Crimea. The establishment as a separate entity was seen as a way to circumvent the effects of international sanctions on Russian banks.

== Sanctions ==
Because of Russian interference in Ukraine and its annexation of Crimea, the Russian National Commercial Bank is under sanctions by the European Union since July 30, 2014, Liechtenstein since July 31, 2014, Canada since August 6, 2014, Switzerland since August 27, 2014, Australia since September 2, 2014, and the United States since March 11, 2015. It was also sanctioned by New Zealand in 2023.

== Operations ==
The bank has issued over a million Mir payment cards as of April 2017. Major companies such as Visa and MasterCard are barred from issuing cards to banks with a presence in Crimea.

According to Vedomosti, in August 2017 the software company Finastra refused to sell its SWIFT interface to the bank, effectively cutting it off from SWIFT.

RNKB is based in Simferopol and owned by the Federal Agency for State Property Management. The bank was assigned an A rating by the Russian ACRA rating agency.
