= Aleksandr Plyushchev =

- Александр Плющев
- Plyushchev in 2021
- Born: 16 September 1972 (age 54); Moscow, Soviet Union
- Occupation: Journalist

Aleksandr Vladimirovich Plyushchev (Russian: Александр Владимирович Плющев; born September 16, 1972, in Moscow) is a Russian journalist, a prominent figure in the Russian-language internet (Runet), blogger, streamer and radio and television presenter. From 1994 to 2022, he worked for the radio station Ekho Moskvy, where he hosted both news and original programs. Following the station's closure, he launched his own YouTube-based news and socio-political project, The Breakfast Show.

As a blogger and author, he focuses on internet trends—specifically their impact on business, society, and civic life, with a lesser emphasis on the purely technological aspect. He also occasionally appears in films and provides voice-overs for animated works.

== Biography ==
Plyushchev was born in 1972 in Moscow into a family of white-collar professionals. From 1979 to 1989, he attended Moscow School No. 751 on Taimyrskaya Street. He later enrolled in the Faculty of Silicate Chemical Technology at the Mendeleev Moscow Institute of Chemical Technology but did not complete his degree.

During his time at the institute, he worked for the university newspaper Mendeleyevets, where he headed the youth editorial team. It was there that he met Dmitry Pinsker—a fellow MKhTI student who also served as a parliamentary correspondent for Ekho Moskvy—and it was on Pinsker's advice that he joined the radio station.

In February 1994, Plyushchev began anchoring news broadcasts for the radio station Ekho Moskvy. Initially, he was primarily entrusted with night-time broadcasts due to a vocal timbre that was not considered typical for a news anchor; however, once Alexei Venediktov became the director of the news department, he moved the young staff member to daytime broadcasting.

Plyushchev periodically serves as a host or organizer for events focused on internet-related topics. He was a member of the international jury for The BOBs blog awards in 2007, 2011, and 2012. In collaboration with the information and analysis agency K2Capital, he co-founded the "Aleksandr Plyushchev Award", which was presented to internet startups in 2009.

In 2010, he conceived and served as the lead producer for an advertising campaign; he also co-hosted the "Runet Award 2010" ceremony alongside Tina Kandelaki. In 2014, he hosted the award ceremony for the Edward Snowden Prize in the field of internet media.

Since 2015, he has regularly hosted the "Wiki-Awards" ceremonies. He is a consistent supporter of the Wikimedia movement, dedicating segments of his programs on the radio station Ekho Moskvy to Wikipedia, interviewing Wikipedians on air, and releasing his own photographs under free licenses.

In November 2017, he hosted the celebratory event marking the 5th anniversary of Roskomsvoboda.

In 2024, SberMegaMarket confirmed that a list of 250 books banned from the service for promoting 'LGBT propaganda' under Russian law – first published online by Plyushchev, was accurate.

=== Foreign agent designation ===
On October 21, 2022, the Russian Ministry of Justice added Alexander Plushev to its registry of individuals designated as "foreign agents". According to Novaya Gazeta Europe, others added to the registry at the same time included Tatyana Felgenhauer, Alexander Rodnyansky, and Mikhail Zygar. The outlet also reported the Ministry of Justice's claim that Plushev and Felgenhauer had allegedly received funding from Deutsche Welle.

In June 2023, the Babushkinsky District Court of Moscow fined Plyushchev 30,000 rubles under Part 4 of Article 19.34 of the Code of Administrative Offenses of the Russian Federation for failing to include a "foreign agent" label on a video posted to his YouTube channel. In October 2023, OVD-Info reported that a new administrative protocol had been filed against the journalist—this time for failing to submit a "foreign agent" activity report.

On January 11, 2024, the Babushkinsky District Court of Moscow imposed an administrative fine of 45,000 rubles on Plyushchev under Part 4 of Article 19.34 of the Code of Administrative Offenses for violating the regulations governing the activities of a "foreign agent". Mediazona clarified that the case concerned the dissemination of materials without the required "foreign agent" label; previously, in November 2023, Plyushchev had been fined 40,000 rubles for failing to submit a "foreign agent" report.

On June 3, 2025, the Babushkinsky District Court of Moscow fined Plyushchev 15,000 rubles under Article 33 of the Code of Administrative Offenses of the Russian Federation, based on a protocol regarding participation in the activities of an "undesirable" organization; the court press service later clarified that this concerned the Carnegie Berlin Center for the Study of Russia and Eurasia. On June 11, 2025, it was revealed that Plyushchev had been placed on a wanted list. Information to this effect appeared in the corresponding database of the Russian Interior Ministry.
