= Transcapitalbank =

Bank of Russia

Joint Stock Bank "TransCapitalBank"
- Native name: Транскапиталбанк
- Type: Closed Joint Stock Company
- Founded: 1992
- Headquarters: Russia, Moscow and regions
- Key people: Olga Gryadovaya (Chairperson)
- Net income: ▲2.046 billion rubles (2020,IFRS)
- Total assets: ▲301.114 billion rubles (2020, IFRS)
- Total equity: ▲29.54 billion rubles (2020, IFRS)
- Number of employees: 2447 (December, 2013)
- Rating: B1 (Moody's) (2017)
- Website: www.tkbbank.com

TransCapitalBank is a Russian commercial bank with a share of foreign capital which includes the European Bank for Reconstruction and Development (EBRD) and International Finance Corporation (IFC). Headquartered in Moscow, Transcapitalbank operates in more than 18 regions, providing financial services to 30,000 corporate customers and over 212,000 retail clients. Transcapitalbank is a top 50 bank in Russia by assets and by equity. The bank is also ranked #7 by lending to small and medium enterprises (SMEs). Transcapitalbank is a full-service bank.

On 20 April 2022, the United States Department of the Treasury's Office for Foreign Relations and Information said that TransCapitalBank is "at the heart of sanctions evasion," and designated the bank and its subsidiaries for having its own assets blocked as part of international sanctions during the 2022 Russian invasion of Ukraine.

== History ==
TransCapitalBank was founded in 1992.

In August 2015, the Bank of Russia introduced a temporary administration to Investtorgbank in the person of the Deposit Insurance Agency. In September of the same year, the procedure for financial rehabilitation of the credit institution began. As part of this procedure, Investtorgbank became the property of its new administrator - Transcapitalbank. In December 2015 a deal was concluded and in January 2016, the Bank of Russia registered a report on the results of the additional issue of Investtorgbank shares - Transcapitalbank became the owner of 99.99% of the shares of the credit institution.

== Shareholders ==
Key shareholders: Mrs Olga Gryadovaya (Chairperson) and her husband Mr Leonid Ivanovski (21,85% and 12,16% respectively) and EBRD (28,59%). International Finance Corporation (IFC) joined the Bank in September 2011 with 7,72% share. Other shareholders have a minority stakes of less than 5% each and include some top management of the bank).

== Regional network ==
Headquartered in Moscow, Transcapitalbank has 74 outlets including 18 branches, 1 representative office and 55 offices.

== Growth ==
As of 31 December 2011, Transcapitalbank's total assets amounted RUB102,24bn (around US$3.2bn), total equity – RUB15,8bn (around US$490mln), net profit – RUB500mn (according to International Accounting Standards). RBC Ratings estimates 2011YE total assets at 108,32bn (around US$3.6bn).

== Ratings ==
- In 2011 rating agency "Expert RA" confirmed its rating of the bank as at А+ "Very high level of creditworthiness".

== International business ==
While the bank primarily focuses on lending to MSMEs in Russia, it frequently utilizes international trade finance and structured (ECA-covered) finance to meet clients' import and export needs. Since 2004, the bank has concentrated on and expanded its trade finance operations. In 2011 the transaction turnover increased to US$380mln and the bank ranked #7 trade finance provider in Russia. Transcapitalbank cooperates in trade and export finance area with more than 50 financial institutions worldwide as well as many ECAs from OECD countries (including German Hermes, Italian SACE, Austrian OeKB, Polish KUKE, Dutch ATRADIUS, Swedish EKN, Canadian EDC, and US Ex-Im Bank). Among the bank's partners in the international markets are Citibank, Deutsche Bank, RBS, BNP-Paribas, UBS, Commerzbank, Credit Suisse, Nordea, IntesaSanpaolo, UniCredit, Standard Chartered, ING, RBI and others.

Transcapitalbank also cooperates closely with the European banking community and is a frequent borrower in USD syndicated market. Since 2007 the bank issued two Eurobonds: USD175mln senior bond repaid in 2011 and US$100mln subordinated bond due in 2017.
