= Russian National Card Payment System =

Transaction system in Russia

National payment card system
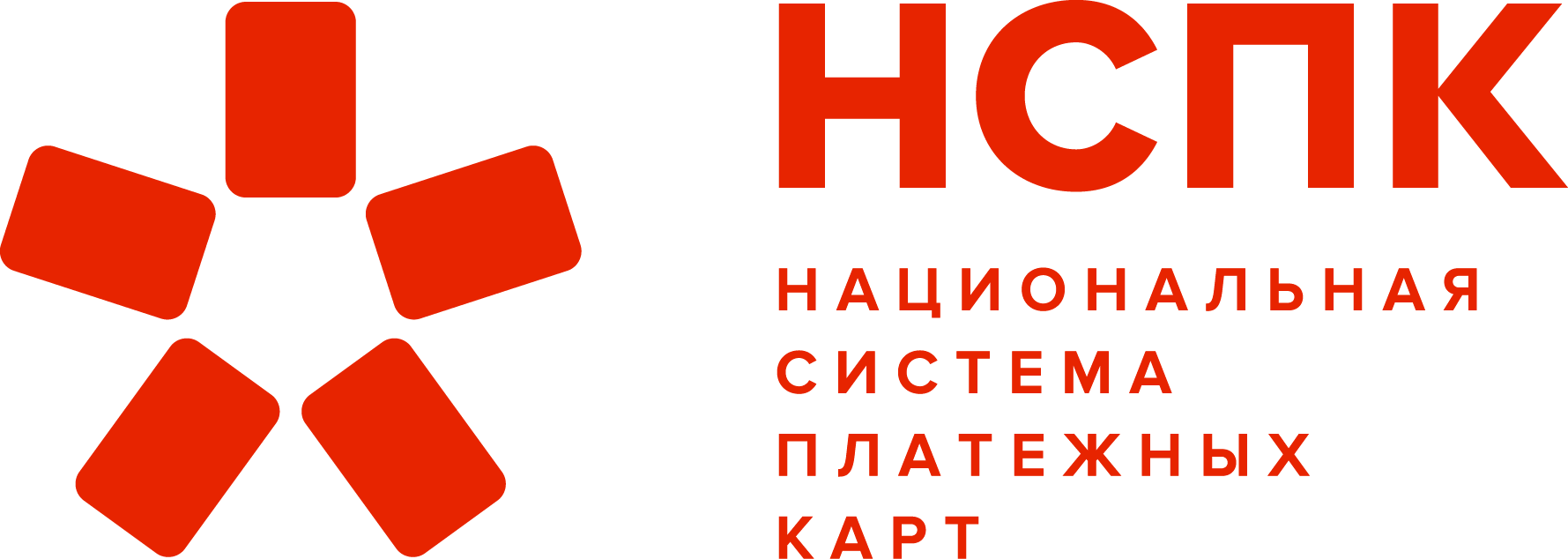

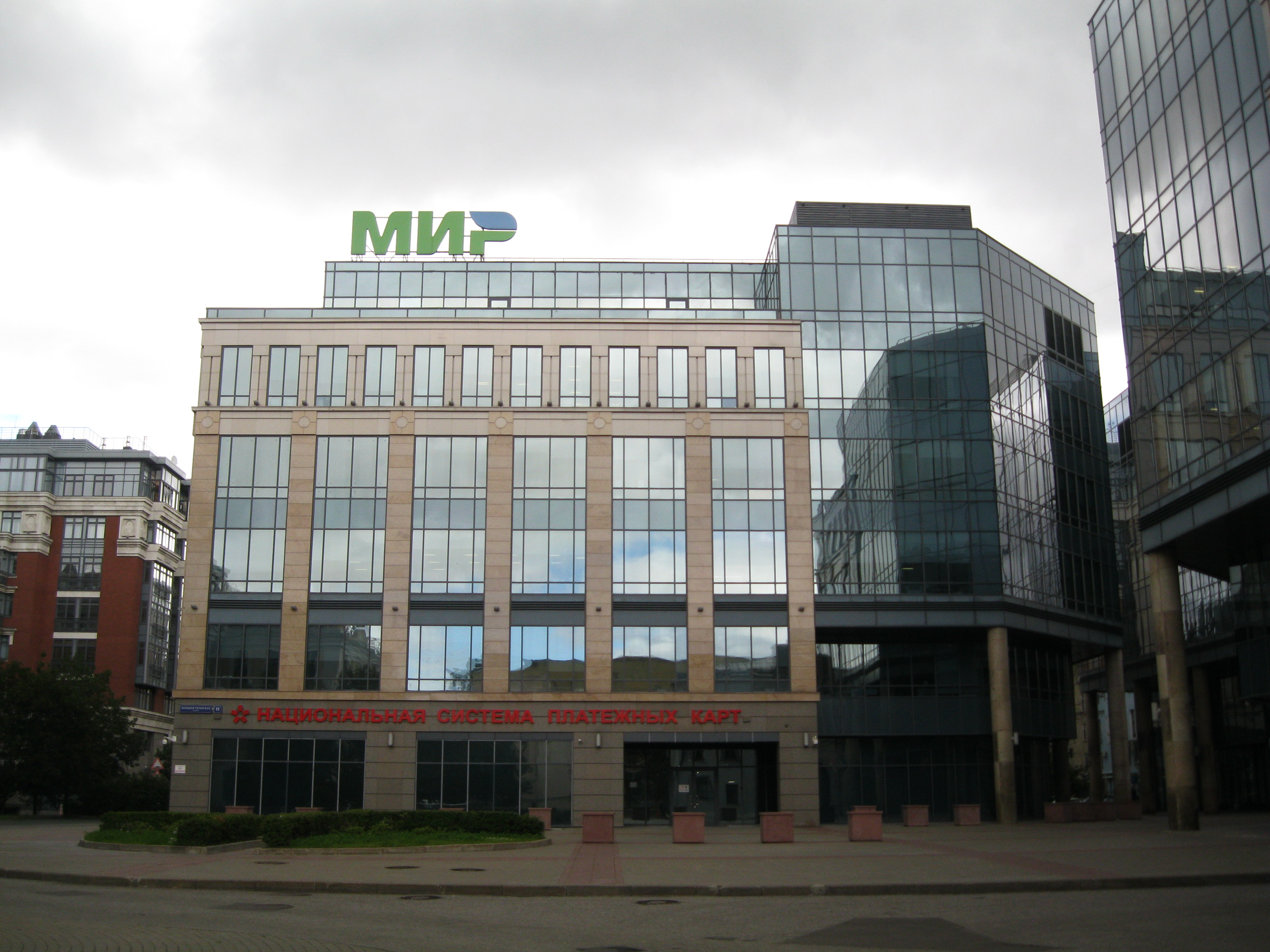
- Native name: Национальная система платёжных карт
- Type: Joint-stock company
- Industry: Financial services
- Founded: 23 July 2014; 12 years ago
- Headquarters: Moscow, Russia
- Key people: Dmitry Dubynin (CEO)
- Services: Payment service provider, payment systems
- Revenue: ₽50.3 billion (2022)
- Net income: ₽25.3 billion (2022)
- Total assets: ₽69.8 billion (2022)
- Parent: Central Bank of Russia
- Subsidiaries: Mir
- Website: nspk.ru

The National Payment Card System (Russian: Национальная система платёжных карт; known its acronym NSPK) is an operational and payment clearing house for processing bank card transactions within Russia and the operator of the Mir card payment system. It is the operational and payment clearing house of the Faster Payment System (FPS) and wholly owned by the Central Bank of Russia (CBR).

On February 23, 2024, the United States Department of the Treasury imposed temporary sanctions against the NSPK. This has no consequences on the territory of Russia, but may limit the use of Mir cards in a few other countries.

== History ==
In March 2014, after the U.S. imposed sanctions against Russia in connection with the annexation of Crimea, the international payment systems Visa and MasterCard for the second time in history stopped servicing cards of several Russian banks in retail outlets and ATMs of the international network. The preparation of amendments to the Federal Law "On the National Payment System" was initiated in order to infrastructurally and informationally enclose the process of money transfers within Russia.

On July 23, 2014, the joint-stock company National Payment Card System (NSPK JSC) was established with two tasks:

- Creation of an operational and clearing center for processing domestic transactions on cards of international payment systems;
- Issue and promotion of the national payment card.

Vladimir Komlev, who previously headed United Credit Card Company (UCS), was appointed CEO of the NSPK JSC.

Since April 2015, all domestic MasterCard transactions have been fully transferred to the NSPK processing. Cards of international payment systems became operational in Crimea.

In June 2015, all domestic Visa transactions were finally transferred to the NSPK processing.

The NSPK signed several agreements on joint issuance of co-branded cards with international payment systems:

- June 19, 2015 — with MasterCard for cards of Maestro;
- July 7, 2015 — with Japanese JCB;
- July 2015 — with American Express.

On December 15, 2015, the NSPK announced the issuance of the first Mir cards by seven Russian banks.

In 2017, the National Payment Card System became a member of the Payment Card Industry Security Standards Council (PCI SSC).

In 2022, due to Russia's invasion of Ukraine, Visa, Mastercard, and American Express suspended their operations in Russia, as a result:

- cards of these systems issued by Russian banks do not work abroad and on the websites of foreign online stores;
- cards of these systems issued by foreign banks do not work in Russia.

However, Visa, Mastercard and American Express cards issued by Russian banks continue to work in Russia. This is possible due to the fact that transactions on them are processed by the National Payment Card System.

At the end of 2022, NSPK's net profit according to RAS increased 2.58 times, amounting to 25.3 billion rubles. The company's revenue by the end of the year amounted to 50.3 billion rubles, assets — 69.8 billion rubles. NSPK also paid dividends of 4.9 billion rubles in 2022 to its sole shareholder, the Bank of Russia, which is 805 million rubles more than a year earlier.

Vladimir Komlev was the CEO of NSPK from the company's foundation until the end of 2023. On January 1, 2024, he left the post. On May 29, 2024, it became known that Dmitry Dubynin would become the new head of NSPK, such a decision was made by the National Financial Board of the Central Bank of the Russian Federation.

== Activity ==
Year	Revenue, bil. roubles	Net income, bil. roubles	Reference
2015	2.61	1.21	
2016	6.21	2.88	
2017	7.9	3.3	
2018	11.8	4.7	
2019	16.2	5.6	
2020	22.2	8.2	
2021	29.4	9.9	
2022	50.3	25.3	

=== Interaction with international payment systems ===
Since June 2015, all banks that are direct participants of international payment systems (IPS) send all intra-Russian authorization requests and exchange clearing messages for Visa international payment system cards through the Operational and Payment Clearing Center (OPCC) of the NSPK.

Since April 1, 2015, all banks' transactions on MasterCard cards have been carried out through the NSPK processing.

In July 2015, NSPK and MasterCard entered into an agreement to issue co-branded cards under the Mir and Maestro brands. In December 2015, Gazprombank issued Mir-Maestro cards.

In September 2016, Russia's National Payment Card System and China's Union Pay payment system agreed to issue joint bank cards. The corresponding agreement was signed on September 14 in Shanghai, and the first cards were issued in July 2017 by Rosselkhozbank. There were a number of Mir-JCB co-branded cards on the market. Such cards were issued by Gazprombank, Rosselkhozbank, Almazergienbank, and Far East Bank.

== Mir payment system ==
In April-May 2015, in a nationwide creative contest "Mir" was chosen as the name and logo of the national payment system. The final version of the logo, finalized by Plenum Brand Consultancy, was presented on July 16, 2015.

In October 2015, the rules and tariffs of the Mir payment system were published on the NSPK website. According to the Russian central bank, they provide for lower prices compared to IPS, as well as the absence of commission for intrabank turnover.

The open issuance of the "Mir" payment system cards began on December 15, 2015. The first issuing banks were Gazprombank, MDM Bank, RNKB, Bank Rossiya, Svyaz-bank, MINBank, and SMP Bank.

As of February 2023, 233 banks joined the Mir payment system, 158 of which are issuers of payment cards.

At the end of the second quarter of 2023, 228.4 million Mir cards were issued in Russia.

=== Mir mobile service ===
On March 4, 2019, the Mir payment system launched Mir Pay mobile contactless payment service in Russia, which can be used by owners of any Android smartphones (starting from version 6.0) with NFC technology support.

== Faster Payment System ==
The NSPK is the operational and payment clearing center of the Faster Payment System (FPS). The system itself was launched in Russia on January 28, 2019. Russians started using FPS in offline and online stores in 2019 as well. The first payments via FPS in various services began almost simultaneously.

== Sanctions ==
The US Treasury Department has issued a warning that it will impose sanctions on banks and companies that continue to cooperate with the NSPK. Those financial organizations that enter into agreements with the NSPK "risk supporting Russia's efforts to circumvent U.S. sanctions", the department said. The first head of the NSPK, Vladimir Komlev, is under US personal sanctions.

On February 23, 2024, the NSPK was placed on the U.S. blocking sanctions list because the center is "responsible for both domestic Russian transactions and international transactions. It helps the Russian Federation circumvent sanctions and remain connected to the international financial system".

== See also ==
- List of financial supervisory authorities by country
- SPFS
