= Sberbank =

Russian bank

PJSC Sberbank

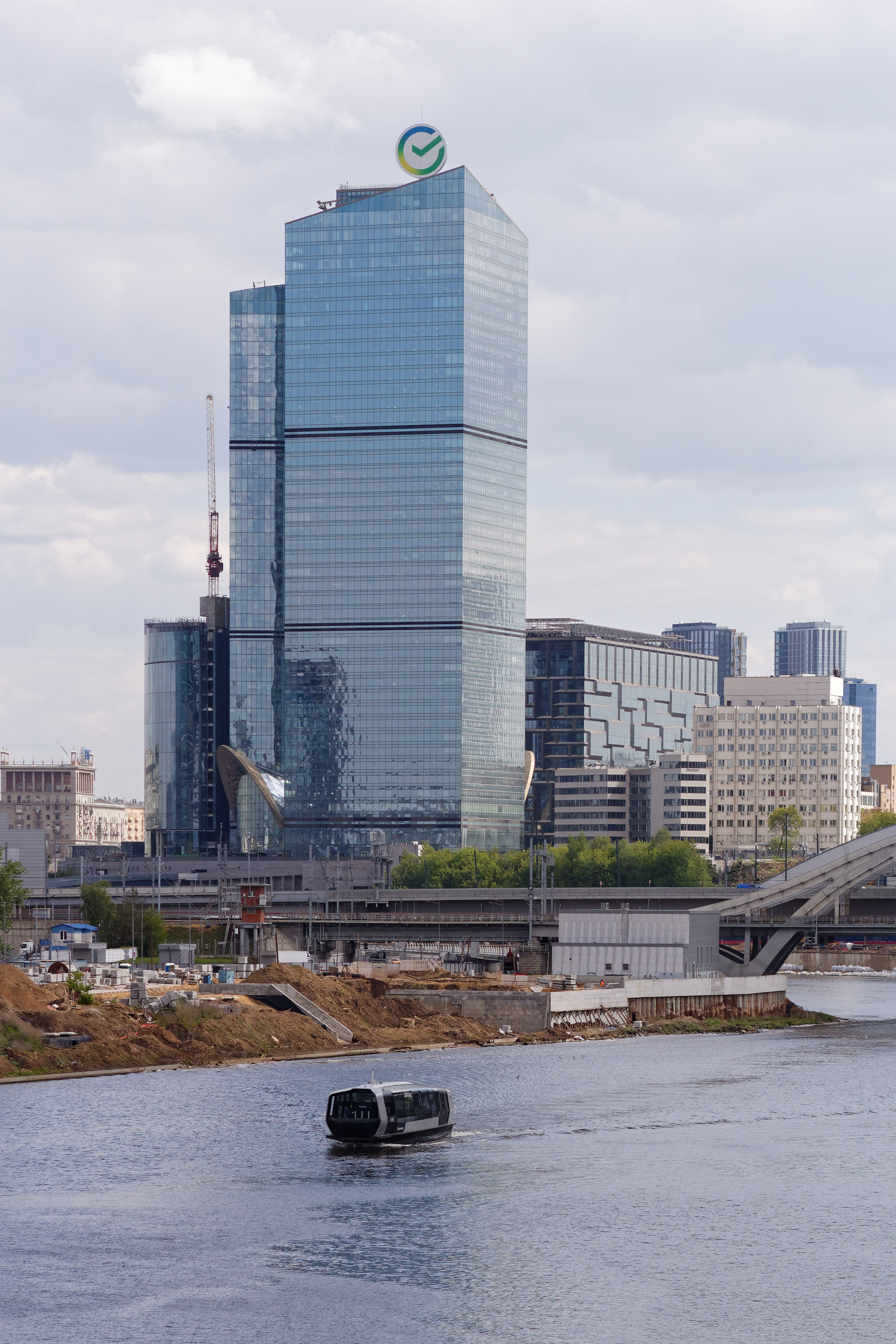
- Headquarters in Moscow, Russia
- Native name: Сбербанк / Сбер
- Type: Public (ПАО)
- Traded as: MCX: SBER
- Industry: Financial services
- Founded: 22 March 1991; 35 years ago
- Headquarters: Sberbank City, Moscow, Russia
- Key people: Anton Siluanov (Chairman-Supervisory Board); Herman Gref (CEO, Chief Executive Officer & Member-Supervisory Board)
- Products: Retail banking; corporate banking; investment banking; insurance; private banking; private equity; mortgage loans; credit cards; investment management; wealth management; asset management; mutual funds; exchange-traded funds; index funds
- Revenue: ▲$40 billion (▲2017)
- Operating income: ▲$40.9 billion (▲2025)
- Net income: ▲$20 billion (▲2025)
- Total assets: ▲$807 billion (▲2025)
- Total equity: ▲$97.9 billion (▲2025)
- Owner: National Wealth Fund, Government of Russia (50%+1 share)
- Number of employees: ▲281,000 (2019)
- Subsidiaries: Sberbank CIB; SberTech; Subsidiaries in some European and post-Soviet countries
- Rating: Ba2 (Moody's), BBB− (Fitch) (2017), AAA.ru stable (NCR 2023)
- Website: sberbank.com sberbank.ru

The Public JSC Sberbank (Note: Russian: ПАО «СберБанк», romanized: PAO "SberBank", pronounced [zbʲɪrˈbank]; initially a contraction of Russian: сберегательный банк, romanized: sberegatelnyy bank, lit. 'savings bank') is a Russian majority state-owned banking and financial services company headquartered in Moscow. Sberbank is the Russian successor entity of the State Labor Savings Banks System of the USSR. The company name was Sberbank of Russia until 2015, and in 2020, shortened its brand to Sber.

By 2022, the bank accounted for about a third of all bank assets in Russia. The bank's growth since the 1990s is in part due to its close connections to the Russian government.

In 2025, Sberbank had 86 branches and one representative office in 79 regions of Russia and one foreign country. As of 2014 it was the largest bank in Russia and Eastern Europe, and the third largest in Europe, ranked 60th in the world and first in Central and Eastern Europe in The Banker's Top 1000 World Banks ranking. In a 2021 world ranking of public companies, Forbes "Global 2000", Sberbank was 51st.

Following the termination of its operations in the European Union in the immediate aftermath of the Russian invasion of Ukraine, its international footprint is primarily in the Commonwealth of Independent States.

== History ==
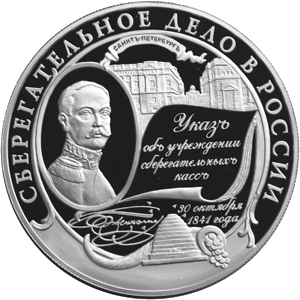
A Russian coin commemorating the establishment of the first savings banks in the Russian Empire in 1841

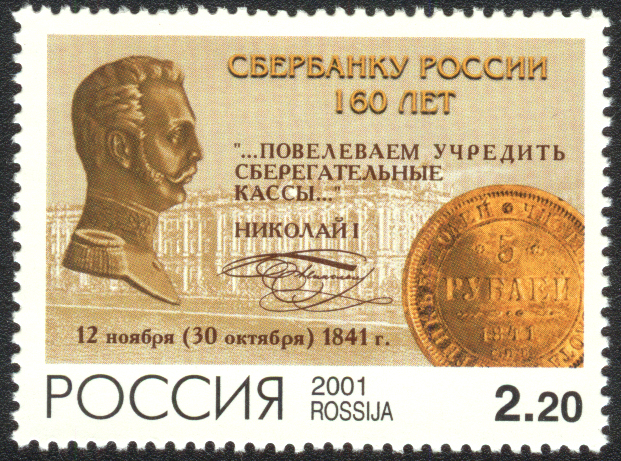
A Russian postage stamp dedicated to the 160th anniversary of Sberbank (2001)

In its corporate identity, advertising, and presentations, Sberbank actively promotes the idea that it is the successor to the Russian imperial savings banks established by Emperor Nicholas I on 30 October 1841, when he signed a decree establishing savings banks in Russia "to provide … the means for saving in a reliable and profitable manner". Since the early 2000s, Sberbank's advertising materials have referred to 12 November as the bank's birthday, a date resulting from a miscalculation when converting from the Julian calendar. The bank also considers Nikolay Kristofari to be its first customer and the holder of the first savings book (his statue stands outside Sberbank's head offices in Moscow and St Petersburg).

There is, however, no legal continuity between the savings banks of the Russian Empire, the State Labour Savings Banks (the USSR Savings Bank), and Sberbank of Russia. After the 1917 revolution, the savings banks were abolished and then re‑established on the territory of the Russian SFSR by a decree of the Council of People's Commissars in December 1922 as new institutions (not as successors to the pre‑revolutionary savings banks). At the end of 1925, they were transformed into the State Labour Savings Banks of the USSR. In 1987, the State Labour Savings Banks were reorganised into the USSR Savings Bank.

On 13 July 1990, the Russian Republican Bank of the USSR Savings Bank was transformed into the Savings Bank of the Russian SFSR (by a decree of the Supreme Soviet of the Russian SFSR of 13 July 1990 "On the State Bank of the Russian SFSR and Banks on the Territory of the Republic"), declared the property of the Russian SFSR, and placed under the supervision of the Central Bank of the Russian SFSR.

In accordance with an order of the Central Bank of the Russian SFSR of 21 March 1991, the Savings Bank of the Russian SFSR was transformed into the Joint‑Stock Commercial Savings Bank of the Russian Federation (Sberbank of Russia, JSC), and on 22 March 1991 a founding meeting of shareholders of this new bank took place. On 20 June 1991, the Central Bank of the Russian SFSR (the future Central Bank of Russia) registered Sberbank of Russia under licence number 1481.

The USSR Savings Bank continued to exist in parallel and was not liquidated until 1 January 1992. Only after its liquidation did Articles 2 and 3 of the Agreement "On the Principles and Mechanism for Servicing the Internal Debt of the Former USSR" of 13 March 1992 establish that obligations for repaying the former USSR's public debt to the population were to be divided on a territorial basis and assumed by the governments of the respective CIS countries from their state budgets. The obligations on deposits opened in the Savings Banks of the USSR and the Russian SFSR (before 20 June 1991) are not a debt of Sberbank of Russia; they have been recognised as domestic public debt (Federal Law No. 73‑FZ of 10 May 1995 "On the Restoration and Protection of the Savings of Citizens of the Russian Federation") and are subject to compensation from the federal budget of the Russian Federation.

=== 1991–2013 ===
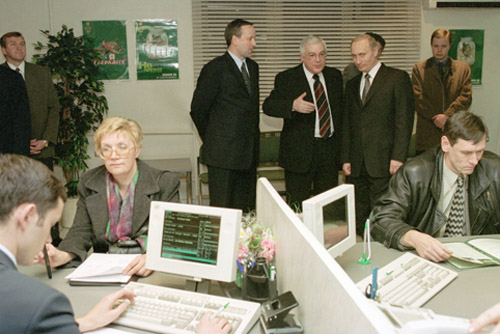
Russian President Putin visits a Moscow branch of Sberbank, November 2001.

In 1991, the operations of the State Labor Savings Banks System of the USSR in the Russian Soviet Federative Socialist Republic were reorganised into the Joint‑Stock Commercial Savings Bank of the Russian Federation (Sberbank of Russia).

In post‑Soviet Russia, Sberbank is the largest universal bank, despite growing competition from private and other state‑owned commercial banks. The bank has gradually expanded its international presence.

Since 2007, Sberbank has been led by former economy minister Herman Gref, a close associate of Vladimir Putin.

2011 Volksbank International acquisition

In 2011, Sberbank acquired Volksbank International AG from its shareholders Österreichische Volksbanken AG, BPCE, DZ Bank, and WGZ Bank. The deal included all Volksbank assets – banks in Slovakia, the Czech Republic, Hungary, Slovenia, Croatia, Ukraine, Serbia, and Bosnia and Herzegovina – except for Volksbank Romania. The agreed price was between €585 million and €645 million, depending on Volksbank's business performance in 2011. Volksbank's total assets, excluding Romania, were €9.4 billion as of June 2011. On 16 December 2013, Volksbank (Ukraine), which was a wholly owned subsidiary of Sberbank, changed its name to VS Bank (Ukrainian: ВіЕс Банк).

2012 DenizBank acquisition

In June 2012, Sberbank bought the Turkish DenizBank for Turkish lira 6,469 billion (about €2,821 billion or US$3.504 billion) from the lender Dexia, which in 2011 was "partly nationalised by the governments of France, Belgium, and Luxembourg". The deal included DenizBank subsidiaries in Turkey, Austria, and Russia.

=== 2014–2017 sanctions ===
After the annexation of the Crimean Peninsula by Russia in 2014, the Obama administration imposed targeted sanctions on 12 September 2014 through the US Department of the Treasury's Office of Foreign Assets Control (OFAC) by adding Sberbank and other entities to the Sectoral Sanctions Identifications (SSI) List. This was done in concert with the addition of Sberbank to the European Union sanctions list on 31 July 2014. The sanctions consist of restrictions on access to EU and US capital markets. After the announcement of the sanctions and by the end of July, Sberbank's market value had dropped more than that of any other major global lender, and investors had moved $22 billion from Sberbank's market capitalisation. Nevertheless, during the following year, Sberbank's share price grew back 89%. Sberbank, together with other Russian banks, filed claims with the highest EU court to lift the punitive economic measures.

On 27 August 2014, Switzerland imposed sanctions on Sberbank and other Russian financial institutions.

On 22 December 2015, the United States imposed additional sanctions on Sberbank and its subsidiaries.

On 17 October 2016, Ukraine imposed sanctions against Sberbank Russia, Sberbank Leasing, and their payment systems Kolibri (Hummingbird), formerly Blitz (Ukrainian: «Колибри» стара назва – «Блиц»).

On 15 March 2017, the president of Ukraine imposed sanctions on Sberbank (and other Russian state‑owned banks operating in Ukraine: VTB Bank, BM Bank, Prominvestbank, and VS Bank (Ukrainian: ВіЕс Банк)) as part of its continued sanctions on Russia for its annexation of Crimea and its involvement in the war in Donbas.

=== 2016–2021 ===
Credit cards – both issuer and payment

As of May 2016, Sberbank dominated the Russian card payments market with a market share of over 61%. Sberbank's competitors in the card business were VTB Bank, Alfa-Bank, Tinkoff Bank, and Gazprombank, which together held only 29% of the card business market.

In November 2016, Samsung Electronics announced a new partnership with Sberbank, allowing Sberbank customers to register their Mastercard credit and debit cards with Samsung Pay. This brought the number of banks whose cards were available on Samsung Pay in Russia to seven. However, this compatibility effectively ceased when Mastercard ceased operations in Russia in March 2022.

2017 sale of VS Bank to Tihipko

In December 2017, due to sanctions, Sberbank sold its Ukrainian subsidiary, VS Bank (Ukrainian: ВіЕс Банк), to Ukrainian businessman Serhiy Tihipko.

In 2019, Sberbank began offering electronic cheques to corporate clients to replace chequebooks. According to its calculations, after the service's introduction, the number of paper chequebooks issued by the bank decreased by 30%.

=== 2022–2023 sanctions ===
On 24 February 2022, as a result of the 2022 Russian invasion of Ukraine, US President Joe Biden announced sanctions against additional Russian individuals and companies, including new restrictions on Sberbank's operations. Subsequently, Sberbank's stock lost more than half of its value. On 25 February 2022, the banking licence of Sberbank in Ukraine was revoked. On 28 February 2022, Sberbank Europe faced potential bankruptcy as a consequence of the sanctions. Deutsche Börse suspended trading in Sberbank stock. Two days later, Sberbank Europe declared that it was leaving the European market. Visa and Mastercard suspended their activities in Russia at the beginning of March 2022. Cards of these systems issued by Russian banks no longer worked outside Russia, and all Visa cards issued outside Russia no longer worked within Russia.

In April 2022, Apple and Google removed Sberbank's mobile apps from their stores. The Android application could be downloaded from the bank's website, but iPhone users did not have this option. In August, the SBOL application appeared in the App Store. It does not formally belong to Sber, but it fully reproduces the functionality of the removed application. A week later, this app was also removed from the App Store. Deputy Chairman of the Board of Sberbank Stanislav Kuznetsov, speaking at the Eastern Economic Forum, warned about new applications being distributed under Sberbank's name. According to him, all new applications on the AppStore claiming to be from Sberbank had nothing to do with the bank. Kuznetsov noted that these were tools for fraudsters to gain remote access to a smartphone in order to steal passwords and bank card numbers.

In July 2022, the EU imposed sanctions on Sberbank in relation to the 2022 Russian invasion of Ukraine. Sberbank was also sanctioned by New Zealand in 2022.

During 2022 and 2023, many overseas subsidiaries lost their licences, closed, were sold, or went into receivership.

=== 2024 ===
In July 2024, Russian FIT LLC, the developer of the PayQR contactless payment service, filed a lawsuit against Sberbank in the Moscow Arbitration Court. The plaintiff alleges that Sberbank has violated its exclusive rights to the PayQR design elements. Sberbank uses its own SberPay QR service. The amount of the claim is 2.9 billion roubles (approximately $333 million). The hearing was scheduled for November 2024.

In July 2024, Sberbank began paying "record" dividends for 2023. One share was worth 33.3 roubles, and the total amount was 752 billion roubles ($8.5 billion). Half of this was allocated to the state, and the other half was distributed among the 1.8 million private shareholders.

On 16 August, Sberbank disclosed, for the first time in three years, the amount spent on remuneration of top management and key executives. In total, they were paid 28 billion roubles (over $300 million) for 2023. This amount was distributed among approximately 650 employees.

=== 2025–2026 ===
In February 2025, Sberbank planned to collaborate with Chinese researchers on AI projects, following the development of DeepSeek's cost‑effective AI model. The bank aimed to engage in joint research initiatives with China, involving its own scientists.

In July 2026, Sberbank announced it would stop servicing foreign-currency and multicurrency Visa and Mastercard bank cards starting 1 September 2026. Sberbank's foreign-currency/multicurrency cards had previously ceased working for hotel bookings or purchases outside of Russia in 2022, after international sanctions were issued following the Russian invasion of Ukraine.

== Rebranding and "ecosystem" (2020–present) ==
In 2020, Sberbank undertook a rebranding. In addition to changing the logo and formally adopting the shortened name 'Sber', the company announced its transformation into an 'ecosystem'. Sberbank decided to become "more than a bank" and began to develop various services, primarily digital: online cinema (Okko), music (SberSound), food delivery (SberMarket), cloud storage (SberDisk), and taxis (Citymobil).

Initially, the 'ecosystem' was built in partnership with the large internet holding company Mail.ru Group, for which a joint venture, O2O (online‑to‑offline) Holding, was created with a capital of approximately 100 billion roubles. However, in the spring of 2021, the parties decided to end their cooperation because of disagreements over management methods and corporate culture.

Another component of the 'ecosystem' is pharmacies. Having launched an online service, Sber Eapteka (e‑drugstore), Sber soon decided to expand the business and open pharmacies in its own branches. It is assumed that purchases there will be more profitable because of targeted packaging of drugs, as well as the production of its own generics.

In 2021, Sber also founded an e‑commerce site, SberMegaMarket, as well as SberMarket, a delivery app.

In the summer of 2021, Sberbank announced the implementation of sabbatical leave. Employees are permitted to take unpaid leave of up to one year – with the retention of their jobs (although this requires the consent of their immediate supervisor). They are also allowed to work remotely for three months a year.

In 2024, SberMegaMarket confirmed that a list of 250 books banned from the service for promoting 'LGBT propaganda' under Russian law – first published online by the journalist Aleksandr Plyushchev – was accurate.

== Deposits of USSR citizens in the bank ==
After price liberalisation in the early 1990s, the state and Sberbank effectively abandoned guarantees to secure citizens' deposits, leading to their depreciation, which, according to sociological surveys, caused sharp dissatisfaction among the population. Since 1996, there has been a phased programme of compensation for depositors' losses. From 16 February 2008, Sberbank branches began paying compensation on Soviet deposits to certain categories of the population.

A law on the full compensation of deposits, taking into account changes in the real value of the rouble, was adopted in 1995, but from 2003 onwards the start of payments was regularly postponed. In 2019, a law was enacted to delay the start of payments until 2023. As of 2022, repaying the entire debt of 345.54 billion roubles in 2023 would have required 62.7 trillion roubles (including indexation). In the autumn of 2022, the government sent a bill to the State Duma to extend the deadline to early 2026.

== Ownership ==
The majority shareholder of Sberbank is the Russian National Wealth Fund managed by the Government of Russia (until 2020 the Central Bank of the Russian Federation), owning 50%+1 voting share of Sberbank's voting shares. The rest of the shares are dispersed among portfolio, private, and other investors.

Russia's central bank cannot sell its stake without a change in Russia's laws.

== Management ==
As of 2007, the president and chief executive officer was Herman Gref, confirmed by the board of directors on 16 October 2007.

Sergei Gorkov joined Sberbank in November 2008 eventually becoming the head of the international operations and the senior vice chairman of the board from 10 October 2010, until 26 February 2016, when he left Sberbank to become the Chairman of Vnesheconombank. He greatly expanded Sberbank from operations in only two foreign countries, Kazakhstan (2006) and Ukraine (December 2007), to over twenty countries including Belarus (2009), Germany (2009), China (2010), India (September 2010), Switzerland (31 December 2011), Austria (acquisition of Volksbank International AG on 15 February 2012; changed name to Sberbank Europe AG on 1 November 2012, with locations in Austria, Bosnia and Herzegovina, Croatia, Czech Republic, Hungary, Slovakia, Slovenia, Serbia, Ukraine, and Germany), Bosnia-Herzegovina (20 February 2013), Hungary (31 December 2011; 1 November 2013, as Sberbank Hungary Ltd), Croatia (February 2012), Czech Republic (20 February 2013), Slovenia (28 January 2013), Serbia (24 December 2012), Slovakia (15 February 2013), and Turkey (acquisition of DenizBank in September 2012). Following Gorkov's departure, Svetlana Alekseyevna Sagaydak (Russian: Светлана Алексеевна Cагайдак) became the new Senior Vice Chairman of the Board.

As of 2021, the chairman of the supervisory board of Sberbank was Anton Siluanov, Minister of Finance of Russia. and Svetlana Mironyuk (formerly from 2003 to 2013 the head of RIA Novosti, and from 2006 to 2016 its editor in chief) became a vice-president and the head of marketing and communications in February 2016.

In February 2022, Sverbank announced the foundation of its own e-commerce holding, headed by its former top manager Lev Khasis, but in a week on 22 February 2022, he left Sberbank.

== Operations ==
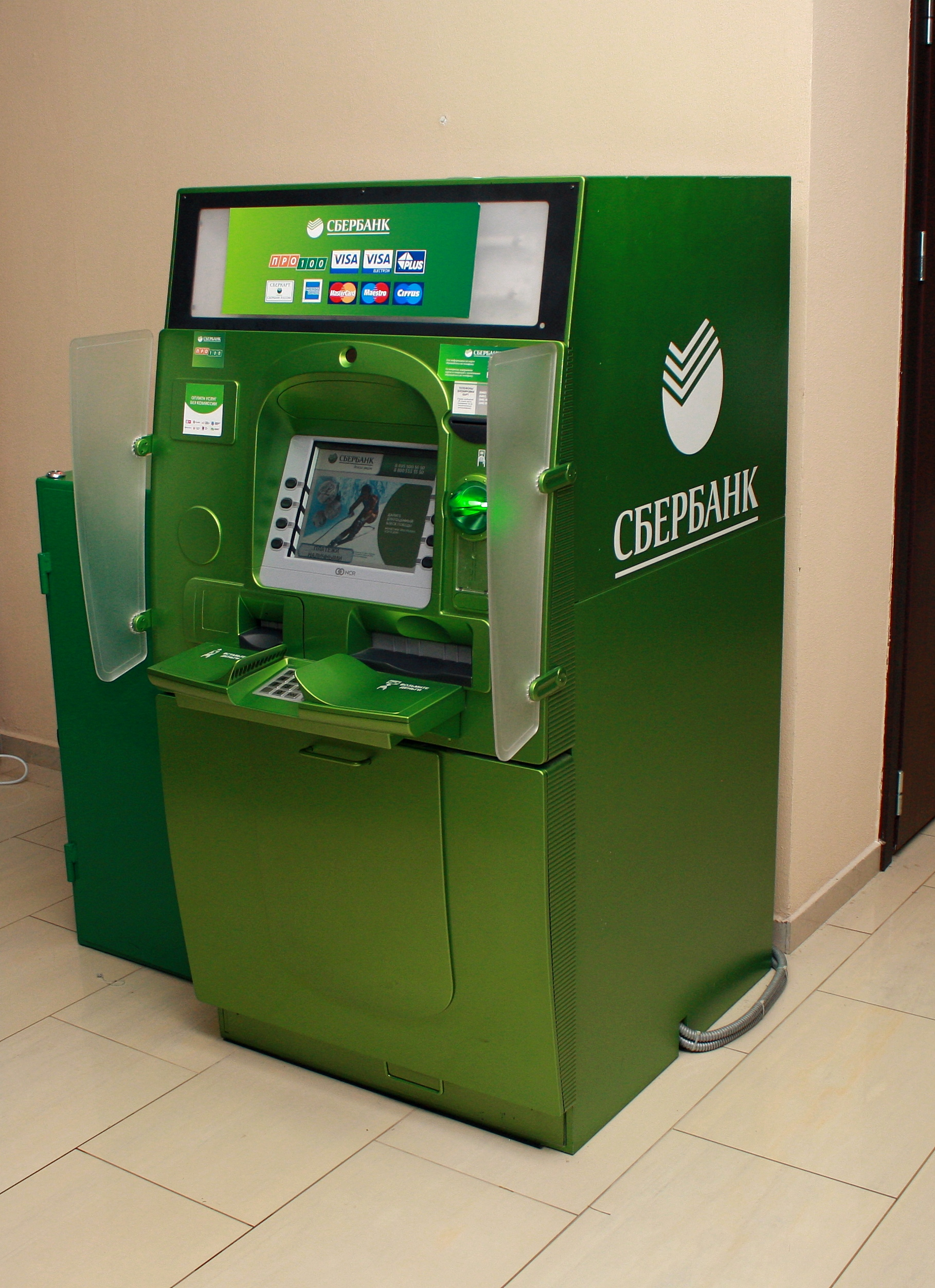
ATM of Sberbank

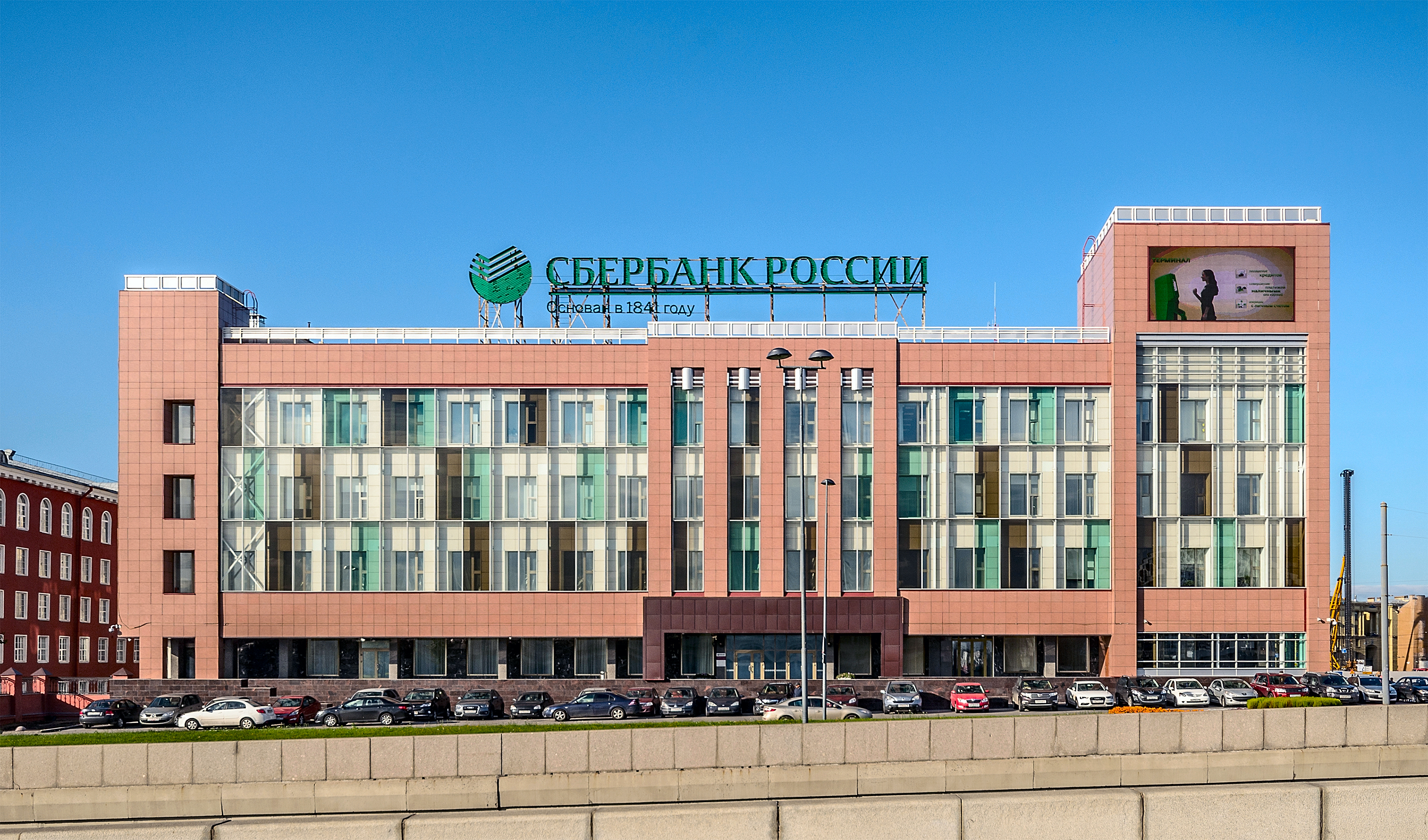
Sberbank regional head office in St. Petersburg

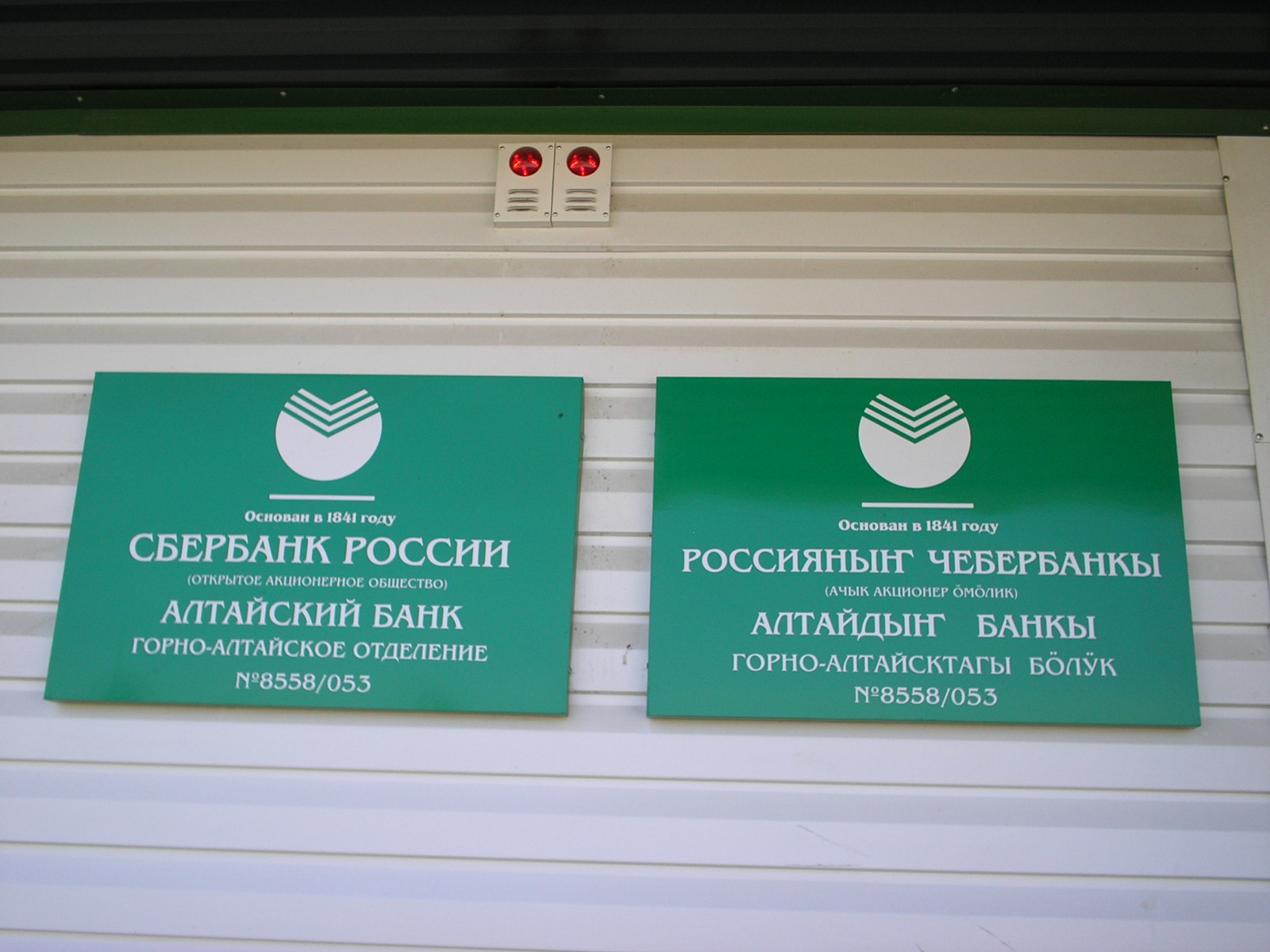
Sberbank sign in Russian and Altai language in Ust-Koksa, Altai Republic

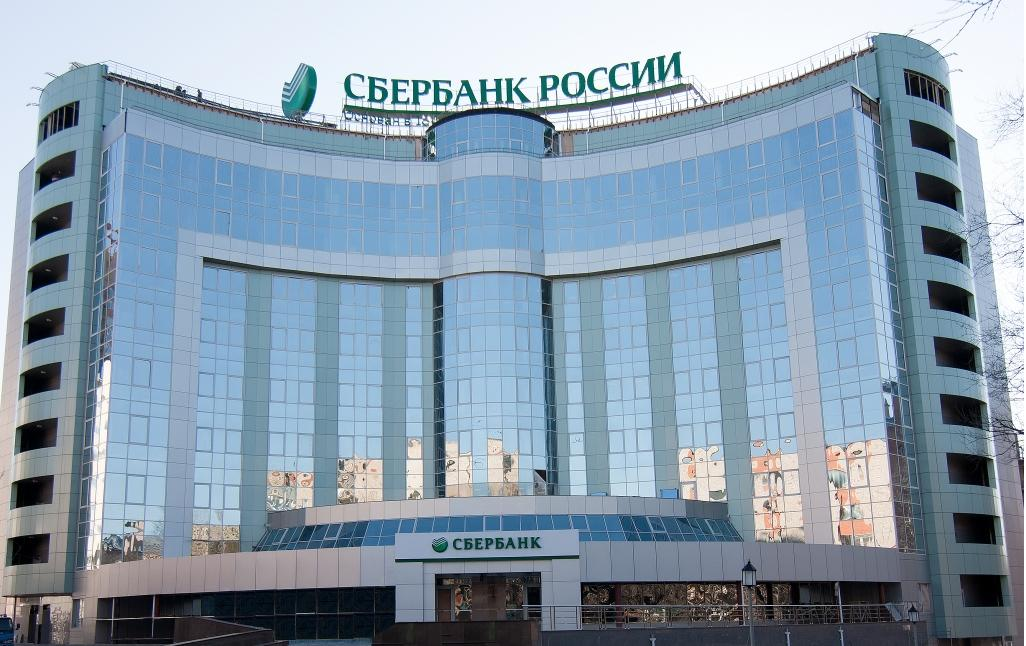
Sberbank office in Khabarovsk

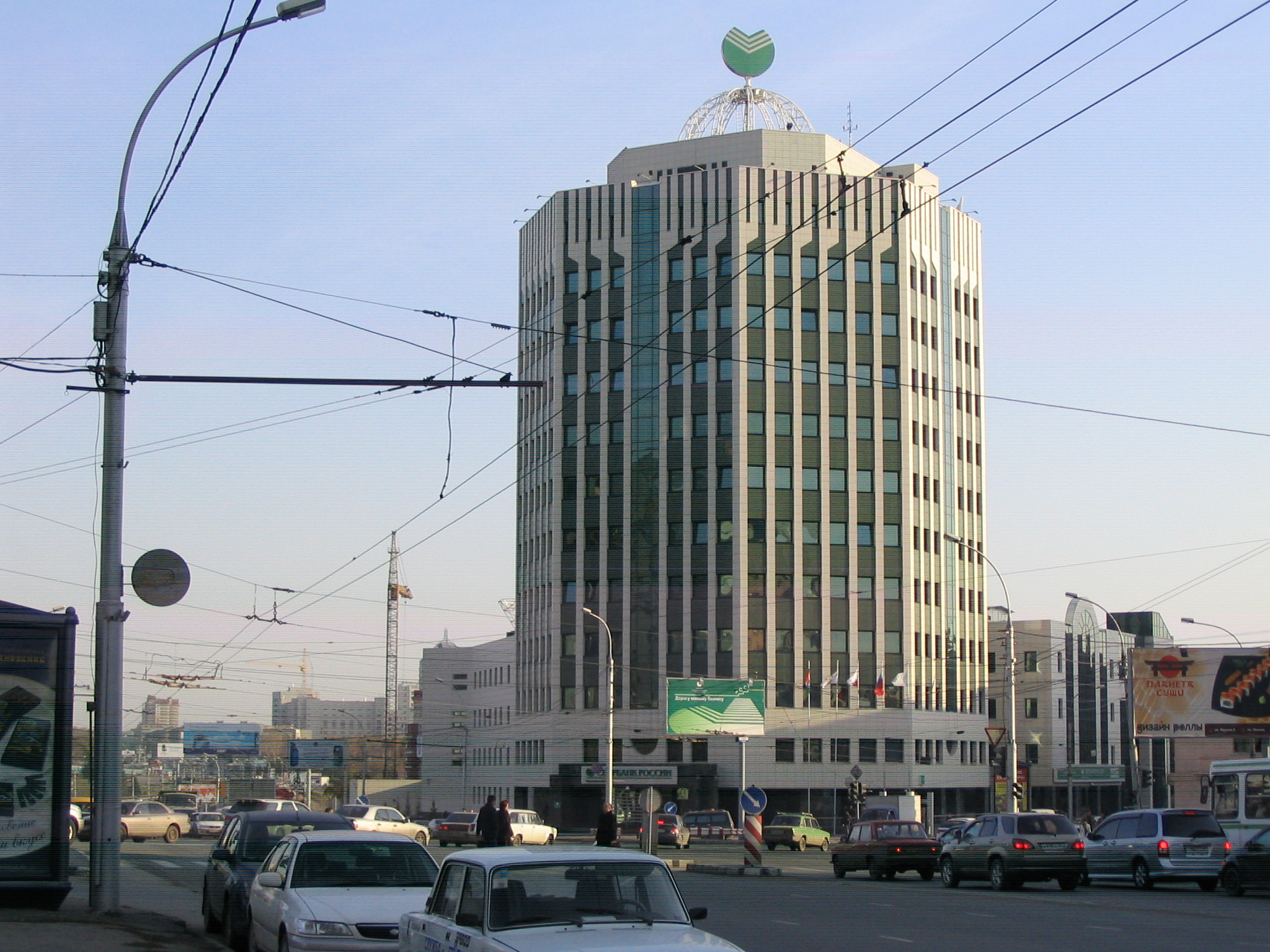
Sberbank office in Novosibirsk

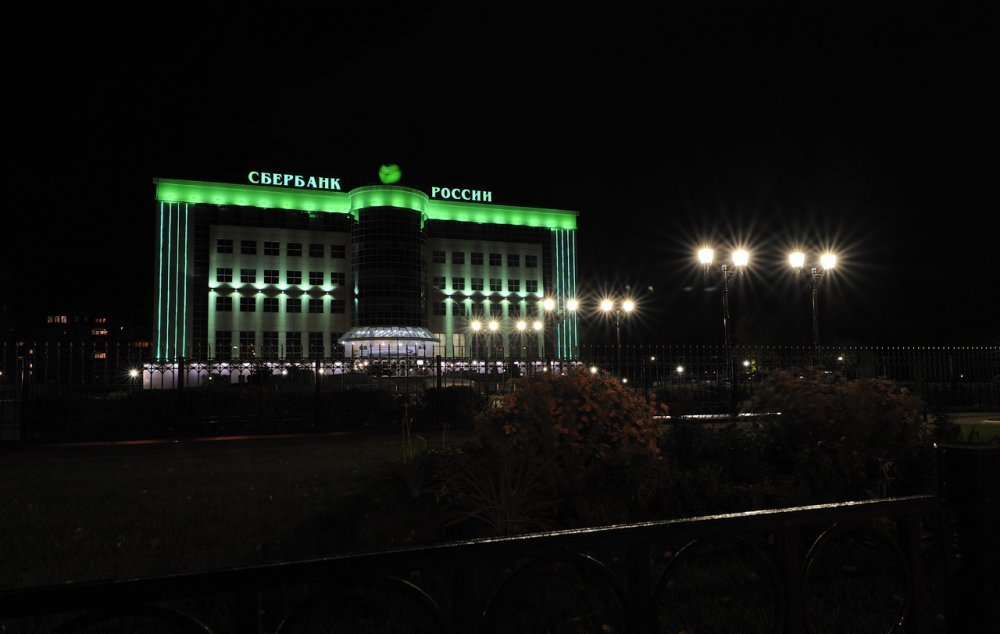
Sberbank office in Tyumen

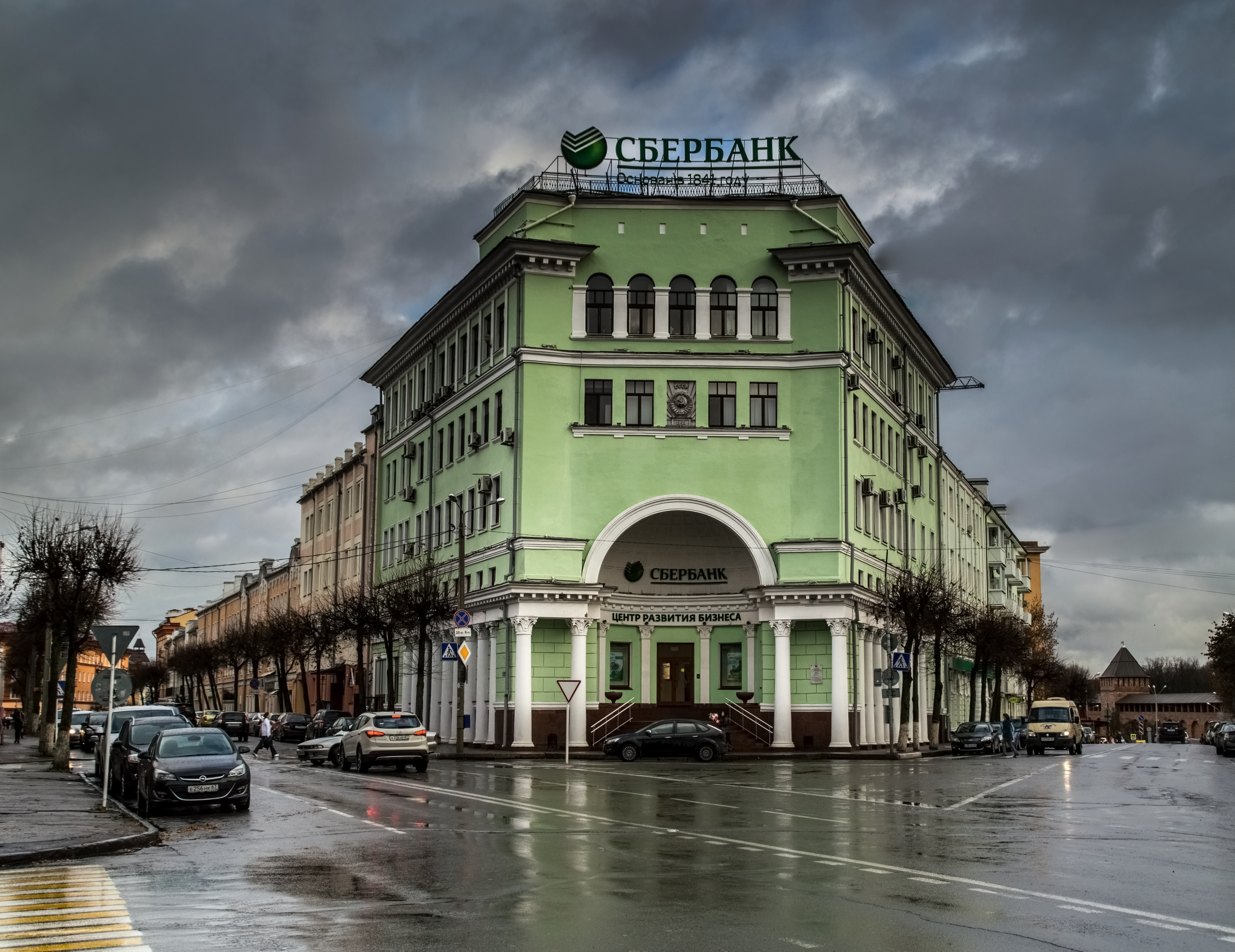
Sberbank in Smolensk

As of 2015, the bank had about 16,500 offices with over 250,000 employees. According to its own estimates, the bank had over 137 million retail clients and over 1.1 million corporate clients in its 22 countries of presence.

As of August 2015, it accounted for 28.6% of aggregate banking assets, calling itself "the circulatory system of the Russian economy", "key lender to the Russian economy and the biggest receiver of deposits".

Within Russia, Sberbank is structured into several regional divisions (territorial banks):

| Baikal Bank | Zabaykalsky Krai; Irkutsk Oblast; Buryatia; Sakha Republic |
| Volga-Vyatka Bank | Nizhny Novgorod Oblast; Vladimir Oblast; Kirov Oblast; Mordovia; Mari El; Chuvashia; Tatarstan |
| East Siberian Bank | Krasnoyarsk Krai; Tuva; Khakassia |
| Far Eastern Bank | Khabarovsk Krai; Primorsky Krai; Amur Oblast; Sakhalin Oblast; Jewish Autonomous Oblast; Magadan Oblast; Kamchatka Krai; Chukotka Autonomous Okrug |
| West Siberian Bank | Tyumen Oblast; Omsk Oblast; Khanty-Mansi Autonomous Okrug; Yamalo-Nenets Autonomous Okrug |
| West Urals Bank | Perm Krai; Komi; Udmurtia |
| Moscow Bank | Moscow |
| Volga Region Bank | Samara Oblast; Ulyanovsk Oblast; Orenburg Oblast; Saratov Oblast; Volgograd Oblast; Astrakhan Oblast; Penza Oblast |
| Northern Bank | Yaroslavl Oblast; Kostroma Oblast; Ivanovo Oblast; Vologda Oblast; Arkhangelsk Oblast; Nenets Autonomous Okrug |
| North Western Bank | Saint Petersburg; Leningrad Oblast; Murmansk Oblast; Kaliningrad Oblast; Pskov Oblast; Novgorod Oblast; Karelia |
| North Caucasus Bank | Stavropol Krai; Ingushetia; North Ossetia-Alania; Kabardino-Balkaria; Dagestan; Karachay-Cherkessia; Kalmykia; Chechnya |
| Siberian Bank | Novosibirsk Oblast; Tomsk Oblast; Kemerovo Oblast; Altai Krai; Altai Republic |
| Central Russian Bank | Moscow Oblast; Tver Oblast; Kaluga Oblast; Bryansk Oblast; Smolensk Oblast; Tula Oblast; Ryazan Oblast |
| Ural Bank | Sverdlovsk Oblast; Chelyabinsk Oblast; Kurgan Oblast; Bashkortostan |
| Central Black Earth Bank | Voronezh Oblast; Oryol Oblast; Lipetsk Oblast; Kursk Oblast; Belgorod Oblast; Tambov Oblast |
| South Western Bank | Rostov Oblast; Krasnodar Krai; Adygea; Crimea; Sevastopol |

=== International presence ===
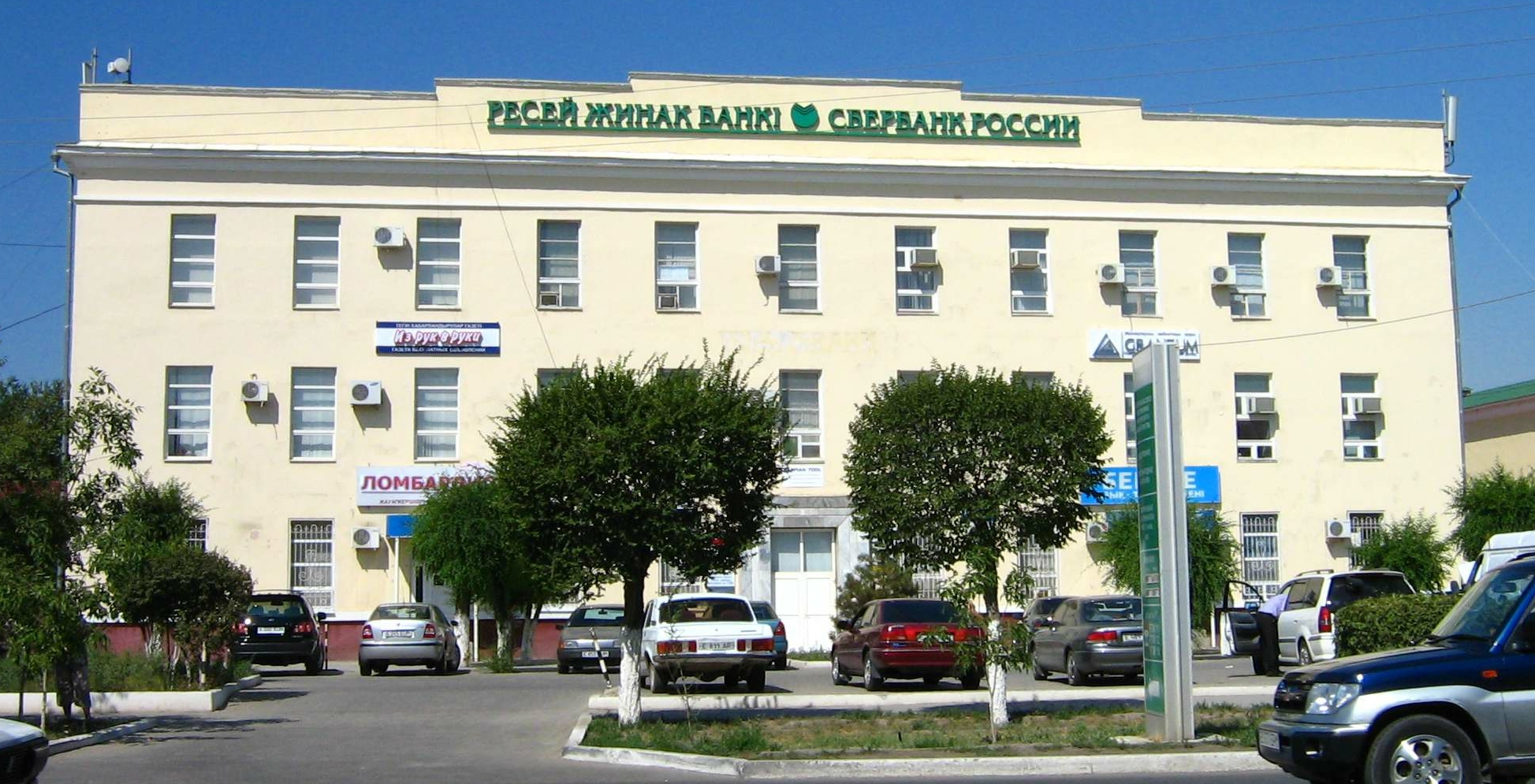
Former Sberbank office in Atyrau, Kazakhstan

| Belarus | BPS Sberbank |
| China | Sberbank International |
| India | Sberbank International |
| Kazakhstan | Sberbank (closed August 2022) |
| Malaysia | Sberbank International |
| Austria | Sberbank Europe (closed December 2022, sold in summer 2023) |
| Cyprus | SIB (Cyprus) (closed May 2023) |
| Czech Republic | Sberbank Europe (closed December 2022) |
| Germany | Sberbank Europe (closed December 2022) |
| Switzerland | Sberbank Switzerland (sold September 2022) |
| Ukraine | Sberbank (closed 2022) |
| United States | Sberbank CIB (wound down 2022) |
| United Kingdom | Sberbank CIB (in receivership 2022) |

The 19 August 2021 Supreme Court of Ukraine ruling forbids the daughter of the Russian Sberbank in Ukraine to use the trademark "Sberbank" since it ruled that Oschadbank is the sole legal owner of the trademark "Sberbank" in Ukraine.

==== 2021-2023 closure of international operations ====
In November 2021, aiming to focus on priority markets, Sberbank Europe AG sold associated banks in Bosnia and Herzegovina (Sberbank a.d. Banja LuKa and Sberbank BH d.d. Sarajevo), in Croatia (Sberbank d.d.), in Hungary (Sberbank Magyarorszag Zrt.), in Serbia (Sberbank Srbija a.d. Beograd) and in Slovenia (Sberbank banka d.d.) to Serbian MK Group for about 500 million Euros.

On 1 April 2022, Sberbank CIB (UK) Limited entered administration. The affairs of Sberbank CIB USA, Inc. were also placed into wind-down from April 2022.

On 23 August 2022, Kazakh financial holding Baiterek announced the acquisition of the Kazakhstani Sberbank subsidiary.

Sberbank Switzerland was sold in September 2022 to m3 Groupe Holding SA and will trade as TradeXBank AG in the future.

On 15 December 2022, Sberbank Europe AG's banking license lapsed, and it can no longer conduct banking activities. On 29 December 2022, Sberbank CIB (UK) Ltd and SIB (Cyprus) Limited were removed as member firms of the London Stock Exchange.

Sberbank will be closing its office in the UAE in 2023 as a result of sanctions pressure.

On 16 June 2023, Sberbank announced that it had sold the Austrian bank Sber Vermögensverwaltungs AG in Abwicklung (formerly Sberbank Europe AG) to an unnamed Austrian company. It was the last subsidiary of Sberbank in Europe.

=== Ongoing international operations ===
In the fall of 2023, Sberbank announced the opening of a branch in China. Also, to work with Chinese clients in the Russian border territories, the bank registered the trademark Сбер银行.

In October 2023, Sberbank launched a line of Islamic finance products: the Adafa interest-free card and the Amana account, which complies with the AAOIFI standard. Products are available in nine regions of Russia, including Moscow, Tatarstan, and Chechnya.

== Sponsorship ==
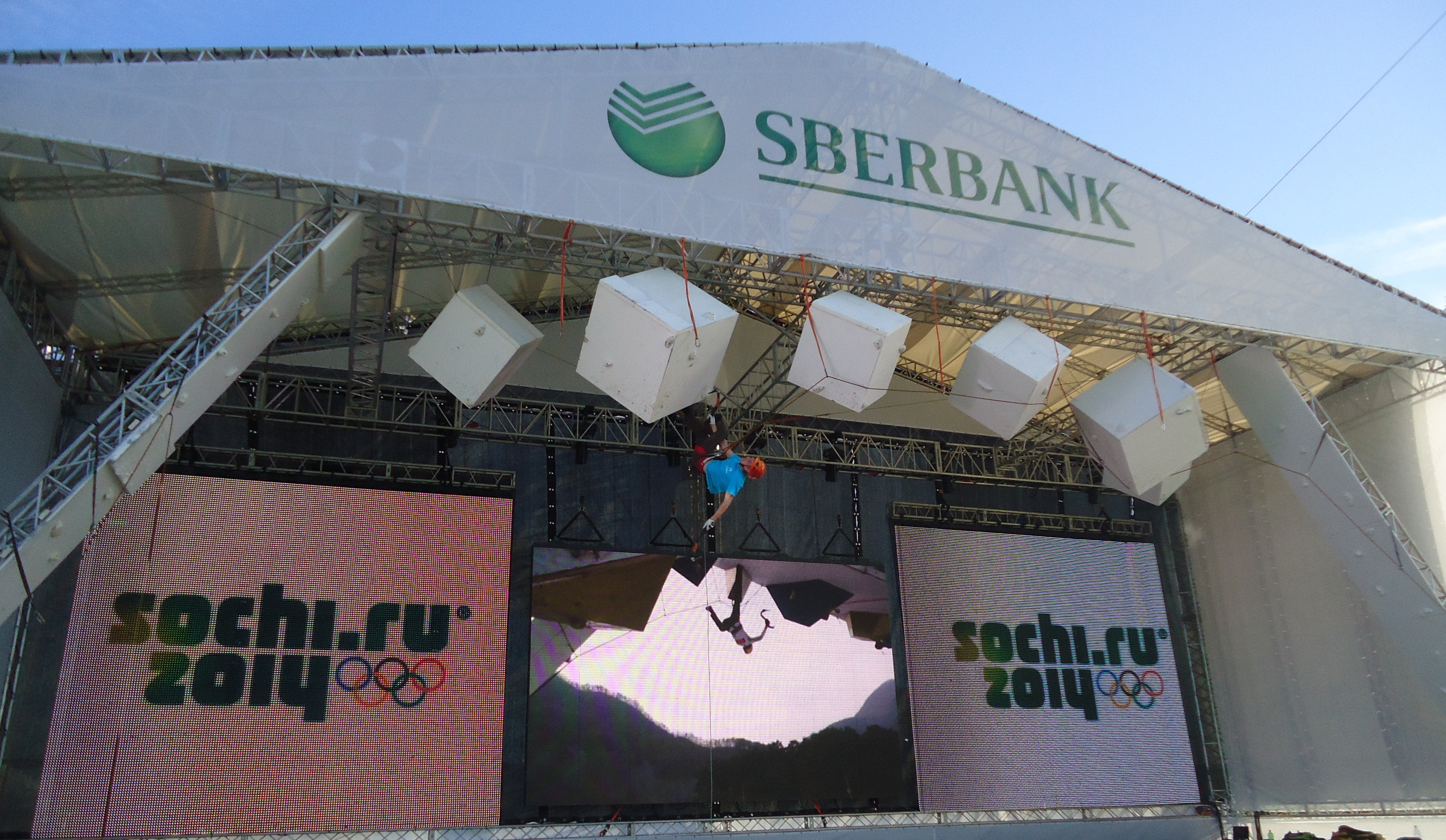
Presentation of ice climbing in the Olympic Park of Sochi at the 2014 Winter Olympics, sponsored by Sberbank

Sberbank sponsors sports and charity events in various regions of Russia, as well as educational projects including projects developing financial literacy.

== Controversies ==
=== Savings freezing ===
Sberbank is the successor of Soviet Savings Banks (as its name implies), whose assets were owned by the state. During Russia's transition to a market economy in the 1990s, in which these assets were sold, Sberbank provided no guarantee for citizens' deposits. This resulted in a landslide depreciation, which in turn led to severe discontent among the Russian population. Since 1996, partial compensation for investors' losses has been offered. However, until 2003, this only applied to state-owned banks such as Sberbank, giving them an unfair advantage over fully private banks.

The 1995 law assumed that debt repayment to the population would begin in 2003, taking into account the current value of the ruble. However, for 20 years, the start of payments was regularly postponed. As of 2022, the full repayment of the debt would cost the state almost 200 trillion rubles. In the fall of 2022, the government introduced a bill on a new delay until 2026.

=== Low level of service in the early 2000s ===
In the early 2000s, Sberbank was frequently criticized for its poor service. In subsequent years, Sberbank introduced new services and improved the quality of some of its existing ones. By the mid-2010s, the bank was reportedly among the market leaders with regards to quality of client services, such as services for retail depositors, premium services and several others.

=== Laundering stolen money accusations, Prevezon Holdings ===
Sergei Leonidovich Magnitsky accused numerous persons and entities of laundering stolen money in tax fraud in a Hermitage Capital Management case in Russia. Owned by Denis Katsyv, Prevezon Holdings, represented by Natalia Vladimirovna Veselnitskaya and Louis Freeh, paid $6 million to resolve the claim without admitting any crime which subsequently led to all charges being dropped by the Justice Department in the summer of 2017. (Note: Prevezon's attorney Louis Freeh was Director of the FBI from 1 September 1993 until 25 June 2001. In November 2017, Katsyv's company Prevezon stated that it would pay the fine using money from AFI Europe, which is a subsidiary of Lev Leviev's Africa Israel Investments. In May 2018, Freeh purchased a $9.38 million home from Armen A. Manoogian in Palm Beach, Florida, near Mar-a-Lago where Freeh often attends events.)

=== Pavlovgranite case ===
In United States court, Sergey P. Poymanov (Russian: Сергей Пойманов), a Voronezh-based businessman, sued Sberbank, several of its subsidiaries and executives, and a business rival for 750 million rubles, claiming that a valuable granite gravel quarry he owned was illegally bankrupted and seized by the bank in a corporate raid in 2012. Sberbank states that it took the quarry as collateral after Mr. Poymanov failed to repay the loan. Sberbank is retaining Marc Kasowitz for this court case.

In January 2017, Herman Gref, a bank chief executive, personally commented on the Poymanov case, referring to the latter as a "fraudster" and accusing him of not paying loans and debts, and that Poymanov is charged with a felony. He stated that Poymanov "extracted" a substantial amount of money from the company and that he was offered a restructuring of his loans, but allegedly refused.

Poymanov was subsequently charged with a bunch of misdemeanors and arrested on May 24, 2017, by Russian police who then subjected him to harsh pretrial detention at a notoriously rough Moscow jail, Matrosskaya Tishina, which is the same jail where Magnitsky died. He was charged with alleged embezzlement of the company's money amounting to almost 1 billion rubles (about US$11 million) as part of Bankruptcy fraud.

=== Ukrainian sanctions and vandalism of Sberbank property ===
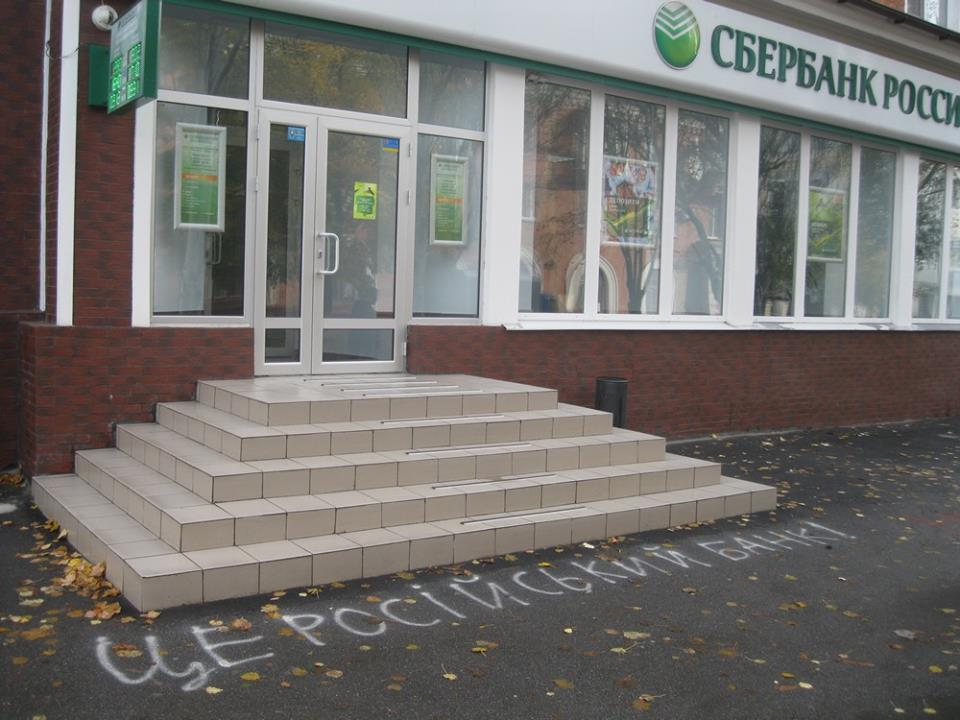
Anti-Russian graffiti "It's a Russian bank" near the department of bank in Oleksandriia, Ukraine

In April 2014, several Ukrainian officials accused Sberbank of funding the 2014 pro-Russian unrest in Ukraine, including alleged terrorism. The bank denied any involvement in the financing of illegal activities on Ukrainian territory, which was later confirmed by an examination carried out by the National Bank of Ukraine.

"It is another instance of aggressive nationalism of neo-Nazi dogma that is gathering momentum in Ukraine and obviously enjoys the support of the official authorities of the country," the Russian foreign ministry stated.

15 March 2017, the president of Ukraine imposed sanctions on Sberbank (and other Russian state-owned banks operating in Ukraine: VTB Bank, BM Bank, Prominvestbank, and VS Bank (Ukrainian: ВіЕс Банк)) as part of its continued sanctions on Russia for its annexation of Crimea and involvement in the war in Donbas. Since then, Sberbank's Ukrainian subsidiary, VS Bank (Ukrainian: ВіЕс Банк), has been put on sale. But as of August 2017, it has been unsuccessfully trying to sell the asset after the National Bank of Ukraine blocked the sale of the bank due to a "failure to provide the necessary and sufficient documents to carry out checks on the investors in compliance with Ukrainian law." In 2017, Sberbank was reported to be waiting for approval from the National Bank of Ukraine to sell its Ukrainian subsidiaries. "Everything is prepared on our side. The question is whether we will be permitted to sell or not by Ukrainian authorities," Herman Gref, who is the chairman of Sberbank, said on the World Economic Forum held in Davos in January 2018. On 13 December 2017, Sberbank sold another subsidiary, VS Bank (Ukrainian: ВіЕс Банк), to a Ukrainian banker, former PrivatBank chairman Serhiy Tihipko.

=== Troika Laundromat accusation in Lithuania ===
In March 2019, the Troika Laundromat was exposed as an international money laundering network involving the Troika Dialog which is an investment bank that has been merged with the Sberbank's subsidiary Sberbank CIB.

=== 2019 data breach ===
In October 2019, it was revealed that analysts from cybersecurity firm DeviceLock had shared information about a large Sberbank data breach with the newspaper, the Kommersant. The personal information of up to 60 million Sberbank credit cards had been offered for sale on the black market. It was the largest data breach to have taken place in Russian banking.

== See also ==
- Banking in Russia
- GigaChat
- VTB Bank

== Bibliography ==
- Unger, Craig (14 August 2018). House of Trump, House of Putin: The Untold Story of Donald Trump and the Russian Mafia. Dutton. ISBN 978-1524743505.
