= Mir (payment system) =

Russian payment system

Mir МИР

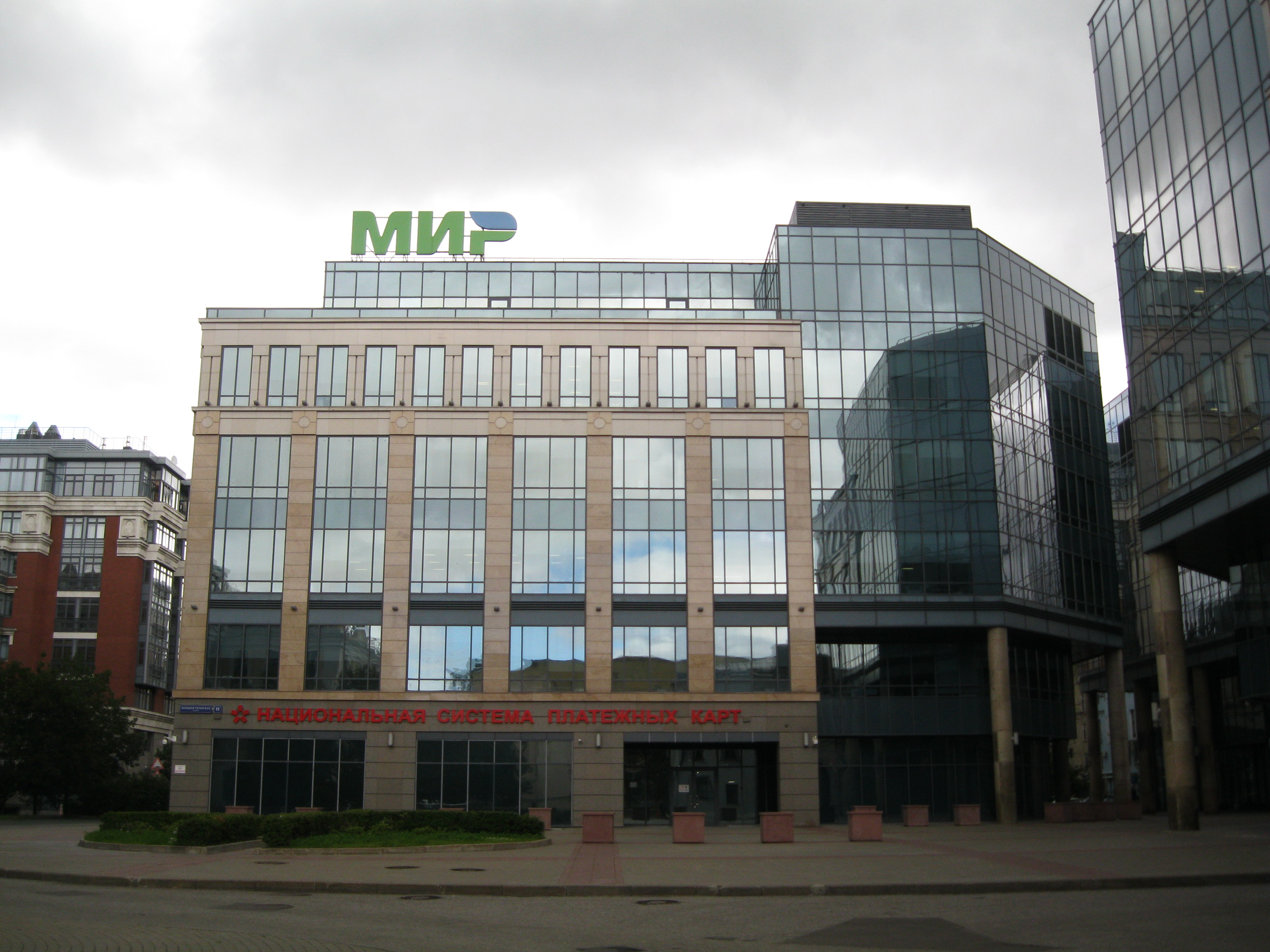
- Mir headquarters in Moscow
- Type: PJSC
- Industry: Financial services, Payment card industry
- Founded: 2015; 11 years ago
- Headquarters: 11A Bolshaya Tatarskaya str., Moscow, Russia
- Area served: Russia Accepted in: Armenia; Abkhazia; Belarus; Cuba; Egypt; Iran; Kazakhstan; Kyrgyzstan; South Ossetia; Tajikistan; Transnistria; Venezuela
- Products: Debit cards, credit cards, payment systems
- Brands: Mir Pay; Mir Secure
- Parent: PJSC Russian National Card Payment System (100% owned by the Central Bank of Russia)
- Website: vamprivet.ru

Mir (Russian: Мир, IPA: [ˈmʲir]; lit. 'the world' or 'peace') is a Russian card payment system for electronic fund transfers established by the Central Bank of Russia under a law adopted on 1 May 2017. It is operated by the Russian National Card Payment System, a wholly owned subsidiary of the Central Bank of Russia. Mir does not itself issue cards, extend credit or set rates and fees for consumers; rather, Mir provides financial institutions with Mir-branded payment products that they use to offer credit, debit, or other programs to their customers.

The development and implementation of Mir was spurred by the imposition of international sanctions against Russia in 2014 to circumnavigate the reliance on the likes of Visa and Mastercard, which were blocked in Russia at the time. Mir created its own Mir Pay wallet for contactless payments.

== History ==
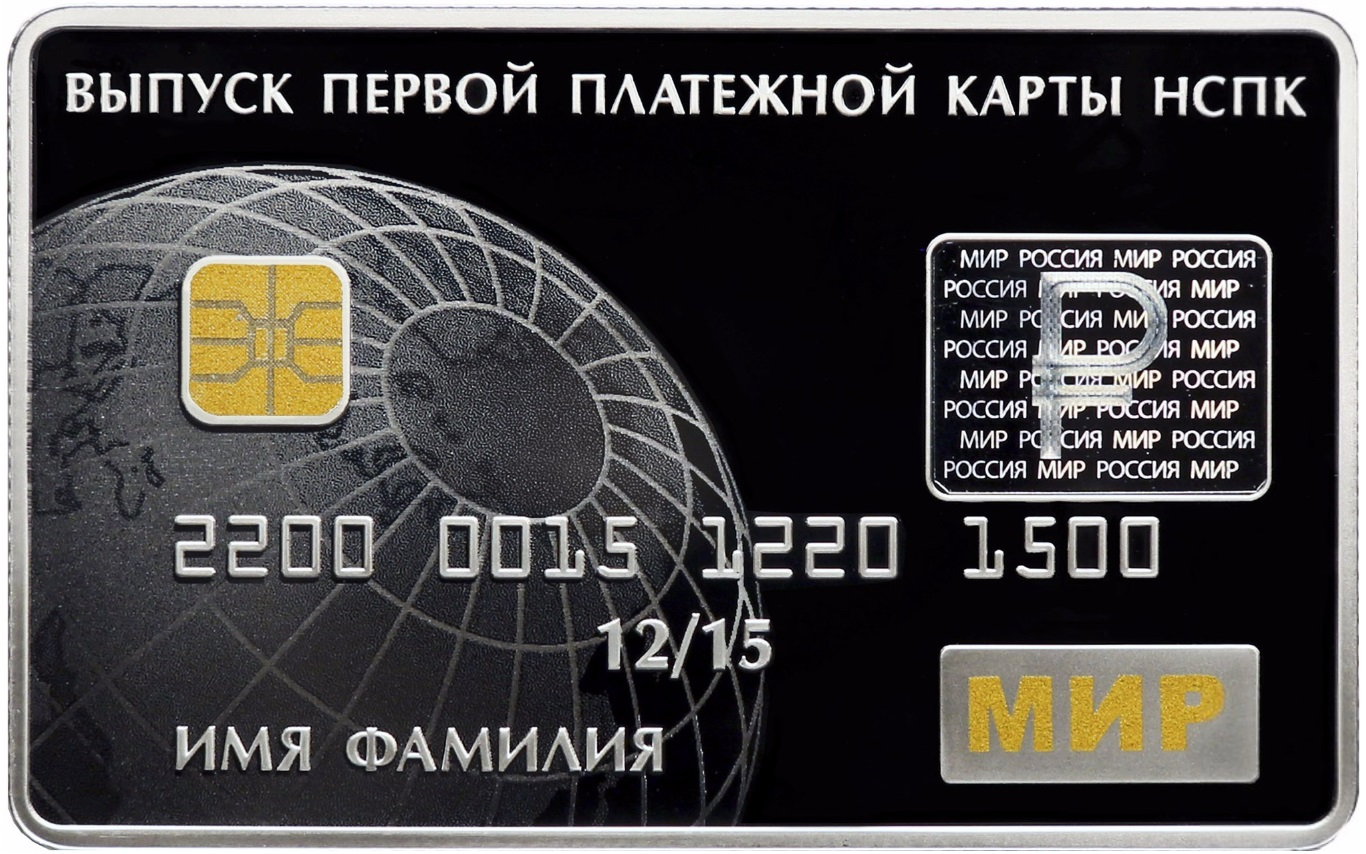
First MIR card issued in 2015 by Central Bank of Russia

Mir, as an idea, was born out of a series of joint initiatives between the Central Bank of Russia and the World Bank in the mid-2000s that aimed to create a framework of an autonomous payment processing system inside the Russian Federation. While development was nearing completion, the 2008 financial crisis put further activity on indefinite hold.

Mir cards were initially accepted mostly by Russia-based companies, such as Aeroflot and Russian Railways, but it gradually became popular among foreign companies with operations in Russia. In April 2016, AliExpress became the first foreign company to accept Mir as a form of payment within the Russian Federation, and McDonald's was the first U.S. company to accept it, three months later.

The system was developed by Belgian digital payments company OpenWay, which created a subsidiary in Russia called OpenWay Solutions, to meet Russian government requirements.

On the basis of the initial groundwork, Mir as a system was formalized in 2014 as a way to overcome potential blocks of electronic payments, after several Russian banks were denied services by US-based Visa and MasterCard because of the sanctions regime against them.

The first cards working on the Mir system were launched in December 2015. Sberbank, Russia's leading bank, started issuing them in October 2016. In July 2016, McDonald's became the first U.S. company to accept Mir for payment in the Russian Federation. By the end of 2016, 1.76 million Mir cards had been issued by 64 banks; five years later, by the end of December 2021, over 113.6 million cards were in circulation. By the end of Q4 2023 More than 287.3 million Mir cards were issued.

In 2020, 3.5 billion payments were issued using Mir, an increase of 75% over the previous year. In March 2021, the payment system announced a ban on the replenishment of foreign electronic wallets, as it considered such operations as high-risk.

== Sanctions ==
In March 2022, as a result of international sanctions during the 2022 Russian invasion of Ukraine, Apple digital wallet services Apple Pay and Google Pay stopped supporting Mir cards. In March 2024 Samsung announced that Samsung Pay would no longer support Mir cards.

The 2022 exit of Visa and Mastercard from the Russian market resulted in significantly increased use of the Russian Mir payment system in Russia and beyond at a time when their combined penetration accounted for less than 70% of the Russian consumer credit card market. Their ceasing of operations in Russia represented a US$1.5 billion annual revenue loss to the two financial services giants. The result was a sharp increase in the number of Mir cards issued. As of April 1, 2022, the number of Mir-compliant cards in circulation exceeded 125 million, an increase of 10.3% from the previous quarter. That sudden and sharp increase in demand created a temporary shortage of chips for Mir cards. It is estimated that banks' demand for card chips is six times higher than the production capacity of their only domestic manufacturer Mikron Group.

In September 2022, the US Treasury Department threatened foreign banks with secondary sanctions for servicing Mir cards. The department said in a statement: “non-U.S. financial institutions that enter into new or expanded agreements with NSPK risk supporting Russia's efforts to evade U.S. sanctions through the expanded use of the MIR National Payment System outside the territory of Russia”. In the following weeks, large banks in a number of countries began to refuse to service Russian cards. Among them were Turkish DenizBank and İşbank, Vietnamese BIDV, Kazakh Halyk Bank, Tajik Dushanbe City. In Uzbekistan, the acceptance of Mir cards was stopped "for technical reasons".

The most serious problem for Russian citizens was the restrictions on servicing the Mir card in Turkey, one of their most popular tourist destinations. The governments of both countries are looking for a replacement for Mir. The Turkish authorities propose to use the Troy national payment system as an alternative.

According to information released by the Bank of Russia, more than 287 million Mir cards were issued by the end of Q4 2023. They account for 56% of all domestic card transactions in Russia and 55% of debit and credit card issuance. The number of Mir cards used in Russia is expected to increase further over the coming months and years as Mastercard and Visa branded cards are slowly phased out of circulation.

The introduction of the Mir payment card and SPFS (Russia's own financial plumbing) has shown that Russia no longer needs Visa or Mastercard to process domestic card payments. Mir has processed most domestic card payments in Russia since 2015, while the main role of foreign operators such as Visa and Mastercard was to run international transactions. Russian banks have considered issuing debit and credit cards with China's UnionPay on them to replace Visa and Mastercard in the processing of international transactions, UnionPay has a wider reach compared to Mir and is accepted in more than 180 countries worldwide. The result would be that Mir would continue to process domestic card payments and UnionPay would replace Visa and MasterCard in the processing of international transactions.

It remains to be seen whether Visa and Mastercard will be allowed to return to the Russian market once the conflict ends. As Ola Oyetayo, the chief executive of payments platform Verto, said "Russian banks that have found themselves scrabbling may not give the US networks another chance: In the long term, they may say once bitten, twice shy – they may not switch back even if they become an option again".

On February 23, 2024, the United States Department of the Treasury imposed sanctions against the Mir card operator – NSPK. This decision has no consequences on the territory of Russia, but could potentially create problems with the use of cards in other countries.

== Operations ==
=== Russia ===
The Mir card was the key part of Russia's strategy to build its own payment system. The country aimed to operate local payments and clearing operations independently from foreign companies such as MasterCard and Visa.

The Mir card came into effect in 2015. Initially it was adopted slowly by Russian banks and consumers. In 2017, Russian President Vladimir Putin signed a law that obliged banks to use only national payment instruments (SPFS/Mir) when carrying out transactions on the accounts of individuals receiving cash payments from the Russian Federation. The law basically meant that pensioners, civil servants, public sector employees, and persons receiving welfare payments had to be paid using SPFS/Mir. The law forced banks to issue Mir cards and retail stores to accept them. By 2020 Mir had achieved a 30% share of the Russian payment card market and this increased further after Visa and Mastercard suspended operations in Russia following the 2022 Russian invasion of Ukraine.

The Russian Central Bank said that by June of 2026 the number of Mir cards issued since its inception was over 475 million and payments in 2026 using the Mir card represented over 75% of all domestic transactions.

Since October 2022, monetary allowances for servicemen mobilized for the war with Ukraine have also been credited to Mir cards.

=== Acceptance in other countries ===
As of October 2024, Mir is accepted by at least one bank in the following countries and two partially recognized territories outside Russia:

1. Belarus
2. Tajikistan - Amonatbank Savings Bank
3. Venezuela (2022)
4. Cuba (2022)
5. Mongolia (2023)
6. Vietnam - VRB (joint Viet/Russian bank) machines
7. Abkhazia
8. South Ossetia
9. Iran
10. Armenia VTB (Russian bank with 53 Branches in Armenia)
11. Kazakhstan VTB still services Mir cards in Kazakhstan.
12. Nicaragua

Countries where Mir was formerly used, but where use has been suspended since 20 September 2022 or earlier:

1. Kazakhstan (2024) Not fully suspended as Russian bank VTB still operates and accepts the Mir card in Kazakhstan
2. Kyrgyzstan (2024)
3. Armenia (2018) Not fully suspended as Russian bank VTB still operates and accepts the Mir card in Armenia
4. Turkey (2019–2022)
5. Uzbekistan (2019–2022)

In Vietnam there is a Russian-Vietnamese bank called VRB that accepts Mir card. A number of banks in Vietnam accept Mir cards.

Russian cards are accepted in Thailand in one of "the very large supermarket chains."

MIR's list of friendly countries includes South Korea. Russians travel to Seoul in August 2023: hotels in Seoul are booked 7.5 times more often in August than last summer.

The Mir cards can also be used in Abkhazia and South Ossetia since 2019

Before the Russian-Ukrainian War, Bulgaria and Thailand were expected to adopt MIR, according to Central Bank of Russia. Mir was also being tested in the United Kingdom and in South Korea. In March 2022, Iran was considering recognizing Mir to allow it to continue trading with Russia as due to sanctions over its invasion of Ukraine, Russian banks were banned from the SWIFT system used globally.

According to the TASS news agency, in the summer of 2022, four African countries and one Middle Eastern country considered launching Mir cards: Ethiopia, Nigeria, Tanzania, South Africa and Syria. Egypt was considering implementing access to Mir in 2022 but no final decision was made as of 2023

=== India ===
In 2023, India and Russia expressed interest in continuing dialogue on accepting RuPay Cards and Mir Cards within national payment infrastructures.

=== Cuba ===
In April 2022, Cuba decided to allow Mir cards. Juan Carlos Escalona, tourism advisor to Cuba's embassy in Moscow, indicated that visitors from Russia will be able to pay for services in Cuba with Mir cards once flights resume between both countries. On 26 July 2022, ATMs in Cuba began to accept Mir cards, Juan Carlos Escalona, adviser to the embassy of the republic on tourism, told the Association of Tour Operators of Russia (ATOR). In December 2023, the Mir card began to be officially accepted at POS terminals.

=== Sri Lanka ===
In May 2022, Sri Lankan ambassador to Russia Janita Abeivikrema Liyanage said that Sri Lankan authorities are working to ensure that the Mir cards are among the cards that can be used upon arrival in their country. “This issue has been resolved. This year it will work". However in October, the Central bank of Sri Lanka noted that approving Mir in Sri Lanka was impossible due to US sanctions. Instead Sri Lankan and Russian banks signed an agreement which allows Russian tourists to remit money to Sri Lankan banks before arrival by direct transfers between Russian and Sri Lankan banks.

=== Iran ===
Iran accepts MIR cards on POS terminals throughout the country.

Also, Iranian bank cards can be used in Russia. It is possible to withdrawal money using an Iranian bank card from an ATM in Russia.

=== Mongolia ===
Banks in Mongolia will soon be able to accept Mir cards, with 80% of the preparatory work done as of February 2023.

=== Thailand ===
Thailand is interested in accepting Mir card payments due to the visa-free stay for Russians in the country being extended to 90 days.

=== Tajikistan ===
On December 29, 2023, Moscow Credit Bank became the first Russian bank to issue a MIR system card to a foreign citizen abroad in Dushanbe. A new technology was tested that allows to identify the client's identity.

=== Myanmar ===
Myanmar was to introduce Mir cards from February 2024.

== See also ==
- SPFS
