= Faster Payment System (Russia) =

Russian payment system

- Native name: Система быстрых платежей СБП
- Short name: FPS
- Location: Russia
- Launched: January 28, 2019
- Operator: Russian National Card Payment System, Central Bank of Russia
- Currency: RUB
- Website: sbp.nspk.ru

The Faster Payments System (FPS; Russian: Система быстрых платежей, acronym СБП) is a system operated by the Bank of Russia that enables individuals to transfer funds using an identifier (currently a mobile phone number) between accounts in different credit institutions. The FPS also supports instant 24/7 payments for work, goods, and services, including transactions made via QR code. In addition, the system is used by legal entities for payments to individuals (insurance compensation, transfers from brokers, and other cases).

The operator and settlement center of the system is the Central Bank of Russia itself, while the operational and clearing center is the National Payment Card System. VTB Bank also functions as a settlement center for the FPS.

In 2024, the FPS processed 13.4 billion transactions totaling 69.5 trillion rubles, including peer-to-peer transfers, retail payments, and transfers from legal entities to individuals. By the end of 2024, approximately 2.2 million retail outlets in Russia had implemented FPS payments.

As of May 2025, the FPS included 225 participating banks. Since its launch, a total of 30.2 billion transactions worth 151.7 trillion rubles have been carried out through the system.

== History ==
=== 2018 ===
At the end of 2018, the Central Bank of Russia announced that banks would not be charged for servicing FPS transactions in 2019.

=== 2019 ===
The Faster Payments System was launched in Russia on 28 January 2019.

Almost all Russian banks connected to the Bank of Russia’s FPS set zero tariffs for transfers within the system, and no fees were charged to clients during the first months of operation.

On 28 February 2019, the system entered industrial operation for a broad range of banking clients, enabling individuals to make instant transfers using a phone number.

FPS payments in retail stores began in 2019, when the first tests were conducted in retail chains, including online payments. Around the same time, the system was introduced into various online services.

=== 2020 ===
Since 1 January 2020, the Faster Payments System has been subject to fees for banks.

From May 2020, all banks were required to process transfers of up to 100,000 rubles per month without charging a commission. For transfers above this threshold, banks were allowed to charge up to 0.5% of the transfer amount, but no more than 1,500 rubles.

On 28 May 2020, Sberbank connected its entire network to the FPS, becoming the last major Russian bank to join the system.

=== 2022 ===
Banks with a universal license were required to provide clients with the ability to pay for goods and services using FPS QR codes from 1 April 2022, while systemically important banks were required to do so earlier, from 1 October 2021.

In 2022, plans were announced to enable FPS payments in favor of the Federal Treasury of Russia, as well as to launch cross-border transfers through the system.

By the end of 2022, the number of FPS users reached 81 million, an increase of 37 million over the year. More than three billion transactions worth 14.4 trillion rubles were carried out through the FPS that year. Compared with 2021, the number of transactions rose by 3.5 times and the volume by 2.9 times. Payments via the system increased 27-fold in number and 12-fold in volume. Over the year, 382,000 retail and service enterprises joined the FPS, bringing the total to 559,000 by early 2023 (482,000 of which were small and medium-sized enterprises).

=== 2023 ===
Growth continued in 2023. In the second quarter alone, over 1.6 billion transactions worth 7 trillion rubles were processed, more than double the figures for the same period of 2022.

From 1 October 2023, Russian banks participating in the FPS were required by the Central Bank of Russia to integrate the system into their online banking services.

=== 2024 ===
On 1 April 2024, the FPS B2B transfer system was launched.

In the first 11 months of 2024, the FPS processed 11.8 billion transactions totaling 60 trillion rubles. The share of FPS in peer-to-peer transfers (C2C, client-to-client) increased to 88.6% during this period, compared with 80% a year earlier. Client-to-government (c2g) payments, including taxes and fines, reached 440,000 transactions totaling 342.2 million rubles in the same period.

=== 2025 ===
In January 2025, FPS transfers became available in nine foreign countries, including Abkhazia, Armenia, Belarus, Kazakhstan, Kyrgyzstan, Laos, Moldova, Tajikistan, and Uzbekistan. The number of foreign banks accepting FPS transfers increased to 50.

== Conditions ==
The minimum daily transfer limit that a bank may set for a client within the FPS is 150,000 rubles. The monthly limit for free transfers per client from each participating bank is 100,000 rubles, while the maximum size of a single transaction is 1 million rubles.

Since 1 May 2024, the commission-free transfer limit for transfers made to oneself through the system has been raised to 30 million rubles per month. This limit applies to transfers from any accounts and deposits belonging to an individual in the same bank, and to several types of online transfers: by phone number via the FPS, by account number through a mobile application, or via internet banking. This enables clients to transfer up to 30 million rubles per month from multiple accounts in one bank to their accounts in other banks, either using different transfer types or exclusively through the FPS.

== SBPay ==
In 2022, the National Payment Card System of Russia, acting as the operational payment and clearing center of the Faster Payments System, announced plans to roll out an updated version of the SBPay mobile application to banks and retail and service enterprises in Russia, featuring contactless payment functionality based on NFC technology.
