= TARGET2-Securities =

Eurosystem securities settlement platform

TARGET2-Securities, in shorthand T2S, is the Eurosystem's platform for securities settlement in central bank money. T2S offers centralised delivery-versus-payment (DvP) settlement across several European securities markets, without being itself a central securities depository (CSD) since it does not offer CSD services such as custody or asset servicing.

T2S is one of the Eurosystem's TARGET Services, together with T2 and TARGET Instant Payment Settlement (TIPS) for cash payments.

== Background ==
Historically, financial market infrastructures in Europe were created to meet the requirements of national financial markets. In most cases, there were one or two dominant players at each stage of the value chain: typically one stock exchange for trading, one central counterparty (CCP) for clearing and at least one CSD for settlement. Furthermore, these national infrastructures were primarily designed to manage securities denominated in the national currency. Securities settlement across Europe thus remained costly and cumbersome.

Despite the introduction of the euro in 1999, the provision of post-trading services (i.e., clearing and settlement) remained heavily fragmented along national lines. For example, there were still 19 CSDs operating in the euro area in 2009 and almost 40 in the 27 countries of the EU. This situation was viewed as encouraging each country's financial market to remain domestically oriented, thus being detrimental to the aim of market integration. Investors continued to invest mostly in domestic securities, and as a result, the euro-area financial market could not fully benefit from the risk diversification and competition benefits that arise from having a single currency. These barriers which provoke a considerable competitive disadvantage for European capital markets were identified in a report by the Giovannini Group led by Alberto Giovannini in 2003.

Some initiatives by the European Commission to remove impediments to competition between national markets have included the Markets in Financial Instruments Directive (MiFID), the European Market Infrastructure Regulation (EMIR) and the Central Securities Depositories Regulation (CSDR). T2S as a pan-European platform was intended to complement these existing initiatives by boosting competition, increasing price transparency, and harmonising practices across Europe.

== History ==
The ECB first announced it was "evaluating opportunities" for a TARGET2-Securities settlement services on 7 July 2006. After market consultations and a decision by the Governing Council of the European Central Bank (ECB), the project was launched in 2008 and the platform started operations on 22 June 2015. The development and operation of T2S was assigned to four central banks of the Eurosystem—those of France, Germany, Italy, and Spain, with the ECB providing project coordination. The T2S Framework Agreement, negotiated between CSDs and the Eurosystem, has been signed by 24 CSDs, of which 19 migrated to the T2S platform in four waves between June 2015 and February 2017.

These were, in alphabetical order of countries: OeKB CSD (Austria), Euroclear Belgium and NBB-SSS (Belgium), VP Securities (Denmark), Nasdaq CSD (Estonia, Latvia, Lithuania), Euroclear France, Clearstream Banking AG (Germany), BOGS (Greece), KELER CSD (Hungary), Monte Titoli (Italy), LuxCSD (Luxembourg), Malta Stock Exchange (Malta), Euroclear Nederland, Interbolsa (Portugal), Depozitarul Central (Romania), CDCP (Slovakia), KDD (Slovenia), Iberclear (Spain) as well as SIX SIS (Switzerland).

In addition, the Danish RTGS Kronos2 was connected to T2S on 29 October 2018, allowing T2S to settle the cash leg of a securities transaction in Danish krones.

In October, 2020, T2S and the associated ECB payments system TARGET2 experienced an outage for nearly 11 hours. Not long before, Euronext NV had also experienced outages.

On 11 September 2023, five more CSDs connected to T2S, namely Euroclear Bank (Belgium), BNBGSSS and Central Depository AD (Bulgaria), SKDD (Croatia), and Euroclear Finland. By end-2023, there were 892 active Dedicated Cash Accounts (DCAs) for settlement in euro on the T2S platform.

== Operations ==
Two types of accounts are located and maintained on the T2S platform: securities accounts provided by participating CSDs, and cash accounts in central bank money provided by participating central banks (i.e. National Central Banks of the Eurosystem and Danmarks Nationalbank). Thus, T2S embeds contractual relationships between central banks and individual CSDs, but not with the latter's clients who are the beneficial owners of the securities. As of 2024, industry participants estimated that some T2S account maintenance functionalities had been maintained in parallel by participating CSDs, generating redundancy of processes, risks and unnecessary costs. Even so, the same source assessed that T2S had significantly contributed to market practice harmonization.

== Central Securities Depositories ==
As of late 2024, 24 CSDs were directly connected to T2S, of which 22 national CSDs (counting the three Baltic countries as one CSD based in Riga) and 2 international CSDs (ICSDs). The third ICSD, Clearstream Banking SA, is also connected to T2S via an omnibus account in Clearstream Banking AG, the German national CSD.

=== National CSDs ===
- (Austria) OeKB CSD, fully owned by Oesterreichische Kontrollbank
- (Netherlands) Euroclear Belgium, Euroclear Finland, Euroclear France and Euroclear Nederland, all fully owned by Euroclear Group
- NBB-SSS, part of the National Bank of Belgium
- (Bulgaria) Bulgarian National Bank Government Securities Settlement System (BNBGSSS), part of the Bulgarian National Bank, and Central Depository AD (CDAD)
- (Croatia) Central Depository & Clearing Company (SKDD)
- (Denmark) (Italy) (Portugal) Euronext Securities Copenhagen, Milan and Porto, fully owned by Euronext Group
- (Estonia) (Latvia) (Lithuania) Nasdaq CSD, fully owned by Nasdaq, Inc.
- (Germany) Clearstream Banking AG, fully owned by Deutsche Börse Group
- Bank of Greece Securities Settlement System (BOGS), part of the Bank of Greece
- (Hungary) KELER CSD, majority-owned by the Hungarian National Bank
- (Luxembourg) LuxCSD, fully owned by Deutsche Börse Group
- Malta Stock Exchange, fully state-owned
- (Romania) Depozitarul Central
- (Slovakia) CDCP SR, fully owned by Bratislava Stock Exchange
- (Slovenia) KDD Central Securities Clearing Corporation
- (Spain) Iberclear, fully owned by BME Group

=== International CSDs ===
- (Luxembourg) Clearstream Banking SA (via Clearstream Banking AG)
- (Belgium) Euroclear Bank
- (Switzerland) SIX SIS

EU-based CSDs that were not connected to T2S as of early 2025 included the Cyprus Stock Exchange (CSE), CSD Prague (fully owned by Prague Stock Exchange), Hellenic Central Securities Depository (ATHEXCSD, part of Athens Stock Exchange), the Central Securities Depository of Poland (KDPW), and Euroclear Sweden. Uniquely in the EU, Ireland has no national CSD, and has been using Euroclear Bank for that purpose since 2021.

== See also ==
- Depository Trust & Clearing Corporation
- European Central Securities Depositories Association

== Sources ==
- "New European Rules to Regulate Settlement and Central Securities Depositories (CSDR)"
- History of the T2S Project
- Fourth T2S Harmonisation Progress Report. European Central Bank. 19 March 2014. Retrieved 2 June 2014.
- Financial Integration in Europe. European Central Bank. April 2014. Retrieved 2 June 2014.
- T2S Benefits: Much More Than Fee Reductions. Ben Weller, European Central Bank. June 2012. Retrieved 17 June 2014.
- Second Report on EU Clearing and Settlement Arrangements. The Giovannini Group. Brussels, April 2003. Retrieved 3 June 2014.
- Payments, Securities and Derivatives, and the Role of the Eurosystem. European Central Bank. 2010. Retrieved 3 June 2014.
