= European Central Securities Depositories Association =

1997 European trade association

- Abbreviation: ECSDA
- Established: 1997; 29 years ago
- Type: Trade association
- Location: Brussels, Belgium
- Region served: Europe
- Members: 41 (2024)
- Official language: English
- Secretary General: Anna Kulik
- Website: ecsda.eu

European Central Securities Depositories Association (ECSDA) is the official trade association for the Central Securities Depository industry in Europe. The association provides a forum for Central Securities Depositories (CSDs) to exchange views and take forward projects of mutual interest.

It aims to promote a constructive dialogue between the CSD community, European and Global public authorities and other stakeholders aiming at contributing to an efficient and risk-averse infrastructure for financial markets. It is one of five regional CSD associations of World Forum of CSDs.

== History ==
The history of the ECSDA dates back to the early 1990s, when CSD chief executives started to meet on a regular basis to exchange best practices and prepare for the adoption of the euro. The idea of formalising these contacts in an association emerged in 1995 at a meeting taking place at the European Monetary Institute in Frankfurt. The association was established in November 1997 with the signature of the first original Statutes of the association in Madrid by the 13 founding members and registered in Brussels Belgium.

Since May 2017, ECSDA is led by Anna Kulik, Secretary General of the association. The Association is governed by the General Meeting of its members, the Board of Directors and the Executive Committee. The association governance is specified in the "Articles of the Association" and its by-laws. While the General Meeting gathers the representatives of the ECSDA Members, the Board Directors are appointed in a personal capacity.

The association holds regular expert discussions and conferences. In 2018, ECSDA held a "Conference on new technology for Financial Market Infrastructures". In 2019, ECSDA held a conference “Towards the Financial Market Infrastructures of Tomorrow”.

In March 2022, in reaction to the 2022 Russian invasion of Ukraine, the European Central Securities Depository Association suspended the Russian depository National Settlement Depository (NSD) from membership in the association.

== Main activities ==
The association has 5 permanent working groups:

1. Risk management of Central Securities Depositories,
2. Public Policy for Financial Market Infrastructures and Central Securities Depositories,
3. Settlement efficiency and discipline,
4. Compliance and
5. Harmonisation/corporate actions.

The association also focuses on Cyber resilience, technological innovation and other. It regularly publishes research reports on CSDs, including technical standards, statistics, positions on regulatory issues. It provides educational material on the role of CSDs in financial markets, including Frequently Asked Questions, an online tutorial and facts about the CSD industry. The association acts as the prime interlocutor for European public authorities and other market associations active in the post-trade sector.

== Membership ==
As of early 2025, ECSDA had 32 full members and 8 associate members.

=== Full members ===
- (Austria) OeKB CSD
- (Belgium) Euroclear Bank
- Euroclear Belgium
- (Bulgaria) Central Depository AD (CDAD)
- (Croatia) SKDD
- Cyprus Stock Exchange (CSE)
- (Czech Republic) CSD Prague (CDCP)
- (Denmark) Euronext Securities Copenhagen
- Euroclear Finland
- Euroclear France
- (Germany) Clearstream Banking AG
- (Greece) ATHEXCSD
- (Hungary) KELER
- (Iceland) Verðbréfamiðstöð Íslands (VBM)
- (Italy) Euronext Securities Milan
- (Latvia) (Estonia) (Lithuania) Nasdaq CSD
- (Luxembourg) Clearstream Banking SA
- (Luxembourg) LuxCSD
- Malta Stock Exchange (MSE)
- (Moldova) Single Central Securities Depository (DCU)
- CSD & CC Montenegro
- (Netherlands) Euroclear Nederland
- (Norway) Euronext Securities Oslo
- (Poland) KDPW
- (Portugal) Euronext Securities Porto
- (Romania) Depozitarul Central
- (Slovakia) CDCP SR
- (Slovenia) KDD Central Securities Clearing Corporation
- (Spain) Iberclear
- Euroclear Sweden
- (Switzerland) SIX SIS
- (United Kingdom) Euroclear UK & International

=== Associate members ===
- (Bosnia and Herzegovina) Registry of Securities (RVP)
- (Bosnia and Herzegovina) Central Registry of Securities JSC Banja Luka (CR HoV RS)
- (Kazakhstan) AIX CSD
- (Kazakhstan) KCSD
- (North Macedonia) Central Securities Depository AD Skopje
- National Depository of Ukraine (NDU)
- (Serbia) Central Securities Depository and Clearing House (CR HoV)
- Central Securities Depository of Turkey (MKK)

== See also ==
- World Forum of Central Securities Depositories – Depository holding financial securities
- Financial market infrastructure – Critical component of the financial system
- TARGET2-Securities
