= Central Depository & Clearing Company of Croatia =

Financial market infrastructure

- Company type: Private company
- Industry: Financial services
- Founded: 18 April 1997; 28 years ago
- Headquarters: Zagreb, Croatia
- Area served: Croatia
- Products: Central securities depository
- Owner: Croatian government (41%)
- Website: www.skdd.hr

The Central Depository & Clearing Company (SKDD) Croatian: Središnje Klirinško Depozitarno Društvo d.d., is the central securities depository (CSD) of Croatia.

== History ==
The SKDD was established as CSD in 1997. As of 2016, the Croatian government held 41 percent of SKDD's equity capital, the rest being scattered among a range of private-sector participants.

SKDD has also developed a central counterparty clearing service, branded SKDD-CCP Smart Clear, first tested in early 2015. The system went live in early 2022. In November 2022, SKDD-CCP Smart Clear d.d. joined the European Association of CCP Clearing Houses (EACH).

In 2023, SKDD introduced a new platforms to support its connection to TARGET2-Securities (T2S), the Eurosystem's securities settlement system. The connection to T2S was successfully implemented on 11 September 2023, simultaneously as Euroclear Bank, Euroclear Finland, Bulgaria's Central Depository AD, and the Bulgarian National Bank Government Securities Settlement System.

== See also ==
- European Central Securities Depositories Association
