= Global financial registry =

A global financial registry (also known as an international financial registry) is a proposed central database on worldwide ownership of financial assets. The database would be compiled from data from large Western central securities depositories (CSDs), such as the US Depository Trust Company, Euroclear Bank, and Clearstream Banking SA. Advocates for a registry say it would improve tax compliance, combat money laundering, hinder organized crime, and increase compliance with sanctions. Prominent advocates for a global financial registry include the Tax Justice Network and José Antonio Ocampo, as well as economists Thomas Piketty and Gabriel Zucman.
