= National Bank of Belgium Securities Settlement System =

Financial market infrastructure

- Type: Subsidiary
- Industry: Financial services
- Founded: January 2, 1991; 35 years ago
- Founder: Belgian government
- Headquarters: Brussels, Belgium
- Products: Central securities depository
- Owner: National Bank of Belgium
- Website: www.nbb.be/en/payments-and-securities/securities-settlement-system-nbb-sss

The National Bank of Belgium Securities Settlement System (NBB-SSS) is one of three central securities depositories (CSDs) in Belgium, together with Euroclear Bank and Euroclear Belgium. The main CSD for Belgian government securities, it is owned and operated by the National Bank of Belgium.

NBB-SSS is one of three remaining central-bank-operated CSDs in the European Exchange Rate Mechanism that are mainly aimed at deposits of government securities, together with the Bulgarian National Bank Government Securities Settlement System (BNBGSSS) and the Bank of Greece Securities Settlement System (BOGS). Other euro-area countries had similar systems in the past but have phased them out, e.g. France in 1995, Finland in 1996, Italy in 2000, and Spain in 2003.

== History ==
NBB-SSS was established by Belgian law of 2 January 1991. Its direct participants include EU-based credit institutions and investment firms as well as the Belgian Treasury administration, Clearstream Banking SA, Euroclear, Sicovam, other securities settlement systems, and the NBB itself.

The securities held on NBB-SSS accounts are mostly government securities as well as short- and long-term securities issued by other government bodies and, to a limited extent, by private issuers. Issues other than those by the Belgian government are managed by issuing agents who participate in the NBB-SSS. As it is operated by a National Central Bank of the Eurosystem, the NBB-SSS is exempt from authorization requirements that apply to other CSDs.

NBB-SSS is connected to the Eurosystem's TARGET2-Securities (T2S) platform.

== See also ==
- Financial market infrastructure
