= Euronext Securities =

Financial market infrastructure

- Type: Subsidiary
- Industry: Financial services
- Founded: August 2020; 6 years ago
- Headquarters: Paris, France
- Area served: Denmark, Greece, Italy, Norway, and Portugal
- Products: Central securities depository
- Owner: Euronext
- Website: www.euronext.com/en/csd

Euronext Securities is the central securities depository (CSD) arm of Euronext. It has been formed from the successive acquisitions by Euronext of the national CSDs in Portugal, Norway, Denmark, Italy and Greece. The change of the first four entities' respective names to Euronext Securities was announced on 9 November 2021 and the name of Athens Stock Exchange's CSD was changed from ATHEXCSD to Euronext Securities Athens on 20 April 2026.

== Local venues ==
=== Porto ===
Interbolsa, full original name Sociedade Gestora de Sistemas de Liquidação e de Sistemas Centralizados de Valores Mobiliários, S.A. (literally "Management Company for Settlement Systems and Centralized Securities Systems"), was established in 1989 as the Portuguese CSD. It was a fully owned subsidiary of Bolsa de Valores de Lisboa e Porto (BVLP). In 2002, it was purchased by Euronext together with the rest of BVLP. It was initially anticipated that Euroclear would acquire Interbolsa from Euronext, but that transaction did not materialize. On 9 November 2021, Interbolsa SA adopted Euronext Securities Porto as its commercial name.

=== Oslo ===
Verdipapirsentralen (VPS), known in English as the Norwegian Central Securities Depository, was incorporated in 1985. It merged with the Oslo Stock Exchange in 2008, and was acquired by Euronext together with the rest of the Oslo Børs VPS Group in 2019. On 1 January 2022, VPS was renamed as Euronext Securities Oslo.

=== Copenhagen ===
Værdipapircentralen A/S (abbreviated VP), the Danish CSD, was established by law in 1980 as a self-governing private non-profit organization. Denmark introduced paperless registration of listed bonds in 1983, the first country to do so. In 1988, the same regime was adopted for listed equities.

On 1 January 2000, Værdipapircentralen was converted into a joint-stock company. On 16 March 2009, Værdipapircentralen was formally renamed as VP Securities A/S.

By early 2020, the capital of VP Securities was held by Danmarks Nationalbank (24.2 percent); Danske Bank, Jyske Bank, Nordea Denmark and Nykredit, by then Denmark's four largest banks (ca. 46 percent in total); and various other shareholders (ca. 30 percent).

Euronext acquired 100 percent of the capital between April and August 2020. On 9 November 2021, VP was renamed as Euronext Securities Copenhagen.

=== Milan ===
Monte Titoli SpA, the Italian CSD, was established in 1978 with support from the Bank of Italy and large Italian banks. It started operations in 1981. In 1986, it became the sole depository of all Italian financial instruments except government bonds, which remained deposited at the Bank of Italy until eventual transfer to Monte Titoli in 2000. Dematerialization was implemented between 1998 and 1999.

Clearstream bought a 7 percent stake in Monte Titoli at the end of 2000. On 6 December 2002, Monte Titoli was acquired by the Borsa Italiana group, which in turn was acquired by London Stock Exchange Group in 2007. It connected to TARGET2-Securities in 2015.

Euronext acquired Monte Titoli in 2020–2021 together with the rest of the Borsa Italiana Group. In January 2025, Monte Titoli SpA adopted the commercial name Euronext Securities Milan.

== Other Euronext markets ==
The services provided by Euronext Securities do not cover the entire range of markets in which Euronext has activity as a trading venue and clearing house. Thus, Euronext Amsterdam, Euronext Brussels and Euronext Paris respectively use Euroclear Netherlands, Euroclear Belgium and Euroclear France for securities settlement, whereas Euronext Dublin has used Euroclear Bank since its post-Brexit migration in March 2021.

== See also ==
- Euronext Clearing
- Euroclear
- European Central Securities Depositories Association
