= Fedwire Securities Service =

Financial market infrastructure

Fedwire Securities Service (FSS)
- Product type: Central securities depository service
- Current owner: Federal Reserve System
- Country: United States
- Introduced: 1968; 58 years ago
- Related brands: FedWire, FedNow, FedACH
- Website: www.federalreserve.gov/paymentsystems/fedsecs_about.htm

The Fedwire Securities Service (FSS) is the central securities depository (CSD) for U.S. government securities, owned and operated by the Federal Reserve. As of 2018 it was the world's largest CSD by value of securities held, well ahead of the Depository Trust Company and Euroclear Bank.

== Overview ==
The FSS started when the Federal Reserve began operating a book-entry system for U.S. Treasuries in 1968. Other federal and federally sponsored agencies followed suit in the 1970s and started issuing book-entry securities. In 1985, mortgage-backed securities were also issued in book-entry form by Fannie Mae and Freddie Mac, followed by Ginnie Mae in 1986.

Thus, the FSS has developed to provide issuance, maintenance, transfer and settlement services for all marketable U.S. Treasury securities and also some securities issued by other federal government agencies, government-sponsored enterprises, and international organizations such as the World Bank. The Fedwire Securities Service is also the key interbank settlement system for Fedwire-eligible securities.

== Settlement model and participants ==
The service is available to depository institutions and certain other governmental or financial institutions with both funds and securities accounts at a Federal Reserve Bank. Securities transfers may be made either free of payment or against payment, although most transfers are made against a designated payment.

Transfers against payment are settled on a delivery-versus-payment basis, meaning that the transfer of securities and the corresponding transfer of funds occur simultaneously. The Federal Reserve has described this structure as a means of reducing principal risk in securities settlement systems by ensuring that securities are exchanged for funds with finality.

The service is used by participants in the primary and secondary markets for U.S. government securities and related instruments, and forms part of the core infrastructure of the U.S. wholesale financial system.

== See also ==
- TARGET2-Securities
- BOJ-NET JGB Services
