= Clearstream Banking AG =

Financial market infrastructure

Clearstream Banking
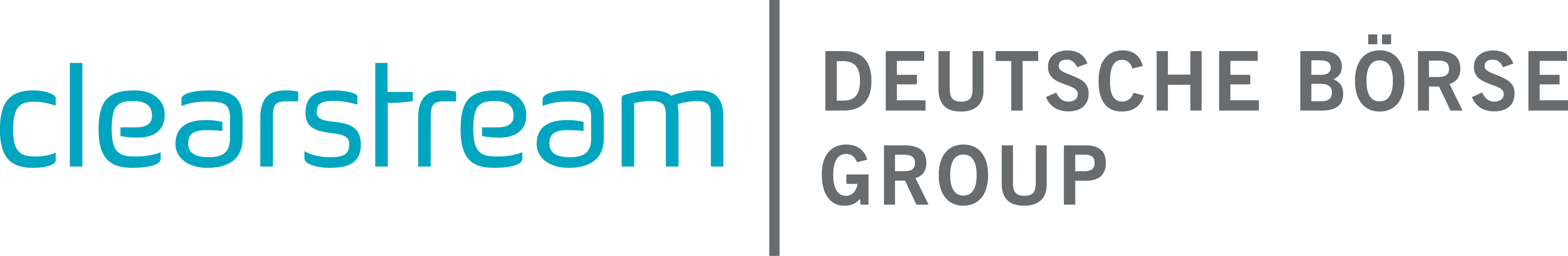
- Company type: Subsidiary
- Industry: Financial services
- Founded: July 12, 1949
- Founder: Frankfurter Kassenverein
- Headquarters: Frankfurt, Germany
- Products: Central securities depository
- Parent: Clearstream Group
- Website: www.clearstream.com

Clearstream Banking AG (to be known as Clearstream Europe AG from 26th September 2025) is the main national central securities depository (CSD) in Germany. It is a fully owned subsidiary of the Clearstream Group, itself part of Deutsche Börse Group.

As of 2018, it was the world's fourth-largest CSD by value of securities held, only surpassed by Fedwire Securities Service, the Depository Trust Company, and Euroclear Bank.

== History ==
On 12 July 1949, the Frankfurter Kassenverein was established to handle the settlement and clearance of securities traded on the Frankfurt Stock Exchange following the wartime and post-war disruption. The word Kassenverein was a reference to a number of pre-war financial institutions that provided market infrastructure services in the German-speaking world, including the Berliner Kassenverein and the Wiener Giro- und Cassen-Verein, the latter being described as the oldest CSD.

In 1970-71, the Auslandskassenverein (AKV) was formed to act as clearing and settlement agent and international gateway for German banks to various foreign depositories, including but not limited to Cedel in Luxembourg.

In December 1989, the Kassenverein arms of the regional stock exchanges in Berlin, Dusseldorf, Frankfurt, Hamburg, Hanover, Munich, and Stuttgart merged as a single CSD for all of Germany, branded Deutscher Kassenverein (DKV), henceforth a subsidiary of Deutsche Börse.

In 1996, the AKV was merged into DKV, which was subsequently renamed Deutsche Börse Clearing AG (DBC) in 1997.

In 2000, DBC merged with Cedel in Luxembourg, and the merged entity became a fully owned subsidiary of Deutsche Börse in mid-2002.

In June 2025, Clearstream Banking AG announced that it would be renamed as Clearstream Europe AG.

== See also ==
- European Central Securities Depositories Association
- List of banks in Germany
