= Strate =

Strate may refer to:

== People ==
- Abigail Strate

== Other ==
- Strate CSD, a South African financial infrastructure
