= Eurobond (external bond) =

International bond denominated in a non-native currency

A eurobond is an international bond that is denominated in a currency not native to the country where it is issued. They are also called external bonds. They are usually categorised according to the currency in which they are issued: eurodollar, euroyen, euroeuro and so on. The name became somewhat misleading with the advent of the euro currency in 1999; eurobonds were created in the 1960s, before the euro existed. The prefix "euro" simply means "foreign" (see eurodollar), not "bonds denominated in the Euro currency".

The eurobond market was traditionally centered in the City of London, with Luxembourg also being a primary listing center for these instruments. Eurobonds have since expanded and are traded throughout the world, with Singapore and Tokyo being notable markets as well. These bonds were originally created to escape regulation: by trading in US dollars in London, certain financial requirements of the US government unpopular with bankers could be evaded, and London was happy to welcome the business to grow their own finance sector. Since then, eurobonds have grown to be a more general way to perform financial operations in a currency while using the regulatory framework of a separate country.

== Terminology ==
Eurobonds are named after the currency they are denominated in. For example, Euroyen and Eurodollar bonds are denominated in Japanese yen and American dollars, respectively. Eurobonds were originally in bearer bond form, payable to the bearer and were also free of withholding tax. The bank paid the holder of the coupon the interest payment due.

== History ==
The first eurobonds were issued in 1963 by Italian motorway network Autostrade, which issued 60,000 bearer bonds at a value of US$250 each for a fifteen-year loan of US$15m, paying an annual coupon of 5.5%. The issue was arranged by London bankers S. G. Warburg. and listed on the Luxembourg Stock Exchange. Allen & Overy, one of London's Magic Circle of law firms, were the lawyers on the transaction. Their conception was largely a reaction against the imposition of the Interest Equalization Tax in the United States. The goal of the tax was to reduce the US balance-of-payment deficit by reducing American demand for foreign securities. Americans could bypass the costly tax and Europeans could keep open access to US capital.

They were named "eurobonds" by analogy with earlier "eurodollar" bank accounts.

== Electronic form ==
Like other commonly traded securities, virtually all eurobonds now trade in dematerialized electronic book-entry form, rather than physical form. The bonds are held at central securities depositories (Euroclear Bank and Clearstream Banking SA being the most common).
