= CDAD =

CDAD may refer to:

- Clostridioides difficile infection, also known as clostridioides difficile associated diarrhea, a symptomatic infection;
- Central Depository AD, a Bulgarian financial market infrastructure.
