= KDD =

KDD may refer to:

- Khuzdar Airport (IATA code: KDD), Balochistan, Pakistan
- Knowledge discovery in databases, a form of data mining
- Knowledge Discovery and Data Mining Conferences, a series of conferences held by the Association for the Advancement of Artificial Intelligence
- KDD – Kriminaldauerdienst (Berlin Crime Squad), a German television series broadcast from 2007 to 2010
- KDD Group, a Ukrainian real estate development company
- KDDI, a Japanese telecommunications company, formerly known as KDD
- KDD Central Securities Clearing Corporation, a financial market infrastructure in Slovenia
- Yankunytjatjara dialect (ISO 639:kdd)

== See also ==
- Special Interest Group on Knowledge Discovery and Data Mining (SIGKDD)
