= Bank of Greece Securities Settlement System =

Financial market infrastructure

- Company type: Subsidiary
- Industry: Financial services
- Founded: 1994; 32 years ago
- Founder: Greek government
- Headquarters: Athens, Greece
- Products: Central securities depository
- Parent: Bank of Greece
- Website: www.bankofgreece.gr/en/main-tasks/payment-systems-and-settlements

The Bank of Greece Securities Settlement System (BOGS) is a Greek central securities depository (CSDs) that is the main CSD for Greek government securities. It is owned and operated by the Bank of Greece. BOGS is also known as the System for Monitoring Transactions in Book-Entry Securities, and is one of two CSDs in Greece, together with ATHEXCSD.

== Overview ==
BOGS is one of three remaining central-bank-operated CSDs in the Eurosystem that are mainly aimed at deposits of government securities, together with the National Bank of Belgium Securities Settlement System (NBB-SSS) and the Bulgarian National Bank Government Securities Settlement System (BNBGSSS). Other euro-area countries had similar systems in the past but have phased them out, e.g. France in 1995, Finland in 1996, Italy in 2000, and Spain in 2003.

As it is operated by a National Central Bank of the Eurosystem, the BOGS is exempt from authorization requirements that apply to other CSDs.

BOGS connected to the Eurosystem's TARGET2-Securities (T2S) platform as part of the first wave in June 2015.

== See also ==
- Financial market infrastructure
