= Eddie Astanin =

Russian economist and financial expert

Chairman of the Executive Board of National Settlement Depository

Personal details
- Born: Eddie Astanin; December 16, 1961 (age 64) Moscow, RSFSR, USSR
- Profession: economist, financier

Eddie Astanin (Russian: Эдди Владимирович Астанин, born December 16, 1961; Moscow) is a Russian economist, the chairman of the executive board of National Settlement Depository, Russia's central securities depository.

He is the first representative of Russia on the board of directors of SWIFT.

== Biography ==
Eddie Astanin born on December 16, 1961, in Moscow.

1984 – he graduated from the A.F. MozhaiskyMilitary Engineering Institute (Leningrad).

1996 – he graduated from the Institute of Retraining and Advanced Training in Financial and Banking Specialties of the Financial Academy under the Government of the Russian Federation.

== Awards ==
- Medal "For impeccable service in the Armed forces of the USSR" III degree
