= KSD =

KSD may refer to:

== Radio and television stations ==
- KSD (FM), a radio station in St. Louis, Missouri, U.S.
- KSD, former callsign for KTRS (AM), a radio station in St. Louis, Missouri, U.S.
- KSD-TV, former callsign for KSDK, a television station in St. Louis, Missouri, U.S.

== Education ==
=== India ===
- KSD Shanbhag Vidyalaya, a school in Satara, Maharashtra

=== United States ===
- Kansas State School for the Deaf, Olathe
- Keeneyville School District 20, Hanover Park, Illinois
- Kentucky School for the Deaf, Danville

== Other uses ==
- Tolai language (ISO 639:ksd), Papua New Guinea
- Karlstad Airport (IATA airport code), Sweden
- Koninklijke Stichting Defensiemusea (Royal Foundation for Defence Museums), the Netherlands
- Korea Securities Depository
- KSD-64, an NSA-developed memory chip
- KSD-1, a WWII US air-to-surface missile
- Kadanuumuu (KSD-VP-1/1), an Australopithecus afarensis fossil discovered in Afar
