= Euroclear UK & International =

Financial market infrastructure

Euroclear UK & International is a UK-based central securities depository that holds UK equities and UK gilts. It operates the CREST system, whose name stands for Certificateless Registry for Electronic Share Transfer. Originally known as CRESTCo (sometimes CrestCo), it was renamed in 2002, following acquisition by Euroclear, as Euroclear UK & Ireland; and in 2021, following the migration of Irish securities to Euroclear Bank, adopted its current name.

== History ==
The CREST project was launched in 1993, following the TAURUS fiasco. The operating company CRESTCo was founded in 1996.

In late 2001, Euroclear began negotiations to acquire CRESTCo. The transaction was completed in the second half of 2002.

== Operations ==
CREST allows shareholders and bondholders to hold assets in a dematerialised, i.e. electronic form, rather than holding physical share certificates. CREST also serves a number of other important functions, such as assisting in the payments of dividends to shareholders.

It is also an "electronic trade confirmation system" ("ETC") (using Trax). When parties to a transaction make a deal, they both electronically confirm their sides of the transaction via electronic transfer. Both parties are required to submit confirmation details to Crest. In the event that transaction details do not match, CREST will highlight the issues and ensure that the problems are resolved as soon as is practicable.

Stamp duty in the United Kingdom is only payable on physical share certificates therefore no stamp duty is payable on shares settled via CREST, however to compensate for this the UK government added a Stamp Duty Reserve Tax (SDRT) which is collected by CREST on behalf of His Majesty's Revenue and Customs.

=== Members ===
There are two classes of members on CREST: members and sponsored members. Members are usually pension funds, inter-dealer brokers or other large financial institutions with significant resources. Sponsored members have the same rights and responsibilities as members. However, given that they do not have the financial or technical resources of the full members, they rely on their sponsoring member to interface with CREST.

=== Registrars and CREST Depository Interest (CDI) ===
UK stocks are held by registrars who are members of CREST and are therefore integrated into the transfer of ownership. Irish equities and ETF securities are also settled directly through CREST members.

For international stocks, CREST holds a pool of them in a local depository, such as Clearstream for German stocks and CDS for Canadian stocks. CREST then issues a CDI to each holder of the security, which can then be transferred in CREST just like a UK equity. This is similar to the depositary receipts issued in other countries. However, restrictions apply to CDIs. They are not withdrawable or depositable into/out of CREST. This is because a CDI is an electronic reflection of the underlying security held in the domestic (country of origin) market. The security provided by CDI are "international securities" in deed poll which includes security through equity shares, Eurobonds, domestic bonds and depository receipts. International securities must be eligible to be held within or through a CSD, which includes Euroclear, DTC, SIS SegaIntersettle (the Swiss clearing system) and any other national or international central securities depositories from time to time specified in the CREST International Manual. The economic rights are not affected by the use of the CDIs.

To take the US as an example, the electronic settlement system in the US is called DTC and if a shareholder holds electronic stock in the US they will hold their securities electronically in DTC. In reality, they will hold the securities via a custodian, so the custodian's nominee details will appear on the company's register. This is known as holding stock in the 'domestic' market. Securities held this way can only be traded domestically i.e. in the market of the country of origin. If the shares are listed in more than one market (for example in the US and in the UK) a shareholder who wants to trade their securities within CREST outside of the US 'domestic' market can instruct their custodian (in this example the DTC) to transfer the securities to the CREST account within DTC.

Restrictions apply, only securities that have a UK quote can be transferred to CREST's DTC account. CREST is a member of DTC. Once the securities have been transferred from the shareholder's account within the DTC and into CREST's account CREST will 'create' the CDI within the CREST and the CDI will appear in the shareholder's account within CREST where the CDI can now be traded in the UK market. The CDI which is traded within CREST will typically have the same ISIN as the US share itself. The legal holder to the share will continue to be the nominee for the DTC.

=== Stamp Duty Reserve Tax ===
HMRC consider that a CDI is a chargeable security for the SDRT. However, where the underlying security is loan capital and that loan capital satisfies the loan capital exemption the trade of the CDI should be exempt from SDRT. Other treatments to the Eurobonds are included in the bulletin published by Euroclear.

=== Law ===
- Uncertificated Securities Regulations 2001 (SI 2001/3755)
- Central Securities Depositories Regulation (CSDR)

Supplemented by CREST rules and conditions in the Crest Reference Manual, June 2009

== See also ==
- London Stock Exchange
- SEAQ
