= Depozitarul Central =

Financial market infrastructure

- Formerly: Regisco S.A. (1997–2007)
- Type: Joint-stock company
- Industry: Financial services
- Founded: July 23, 1997; 28 years ago (as Regisco S.A.)
- Headquarters: Bucharest, Romania
- Key people: Silvia Buicanescu (CEO)
- Owner: Bucharest Stock Exchange
- Website: www.depozitarulcentral.ro

Depozitarul Central (lit. 'Central Depository') is the central securities depository (CSD) of Romania. Headquartered in Bucharest, it provides clearing and settlement services for trades executed on the Bucharest Stock Exchange (BVB), maintains the central registry of shareholders for Romanian public companies, and offers a range of related post-trade services.

The institution is a joint-stock company, a member of the Bucharest Stock Exchange group, and is regulated by the Romanian Financial Supervisory Authority (ASF) and the National Bank of Romania (BNR).

== History ==
Depozitarul Central traces its origins to 1997, when Regisco, a central securities depository, was founded on 23 July of that year. On 11 May 2006, the Bucharest Stock Exchange acquired control of Regisco. The institution was renamed Depozitarul Central on 3 January 2007. The National Securities Commission (CNVM) authorised its operation on 14 December 2006, and the new central securities depositary took over the depository and registry services previously handled by the National Company for Clearing, Settlement and Depository for Securities (SNCDD) on 10 April 2007. This transfer also included taking over the shareholder registers for all listed companies.

The early years of the central securities depositary saw considerable growth in its operational capabilities. In 2007, its initial share capital stood at over €3 million, and it managed over 10 million accounts for nearly half of Romania's population through 14 regional agencies. Capital was later increased to €5 million. In March 2012, Depozitarul Central launched a turnaround settlement service to provide more efficient settlement for over-the-counter (OTC) trades.

A major milestone in the institution's development was its data migration to the TARGET2-Securities (T2S) platform, the Eurosystem's securities settlement engine. Depozitarul Central committed to joining T2S in the first migration wave and successfully completed the transition on 22 June 2015. The connection to T2S allowed Depozitarul Central to offer harmonised and simplified settlement services in euro, using central bank money, thereby reducing settlement risk.

== Services ==
Depozitarul Central provides a comprehensive range of post-trade services. It offers clearing and settlement services for financial instruments traded on the Bucharest Stock Exchange, as well as for over-the-counter (OTC) trades and alternative trading systems. Settlement is performed on a delivery versus payment (DVP) basis, typically two days after the trade date (T+2).

Its connection to the TARGET2-Securities (T2S) platform, achieved in June 2015, enables cross-border settlement in euro and aligns its services with European market standards. The institution is a member of the European Central Securities Depositories Association (ECSDA) and the International Securities Services Association (ISSA).

The depository maintains the centralised shareholder register for issuers of financial instruments, processing corporate actions such as dividend payments and general meetings. It also provides notary services, which involve the initial recording of securities in the book entry system. Depozitarul Central is the National Numbering Agency (NNA) for Romania, authorised to assign International Securities Identification Numbers (ISIN), Classification of Financial Instruments (CFI) codes, and Financial Instrument Short Names (FISN). Since December 2018, it has also been authorised to issue Legal Entity Identifiers (LEIs) for Romanian entities.

== See also ==
- European Central Securities Depositories Association
- Central securities depository
- Bucharest Stock Exchange
- TARGET2-Securities
