= Nasdaq CSD =

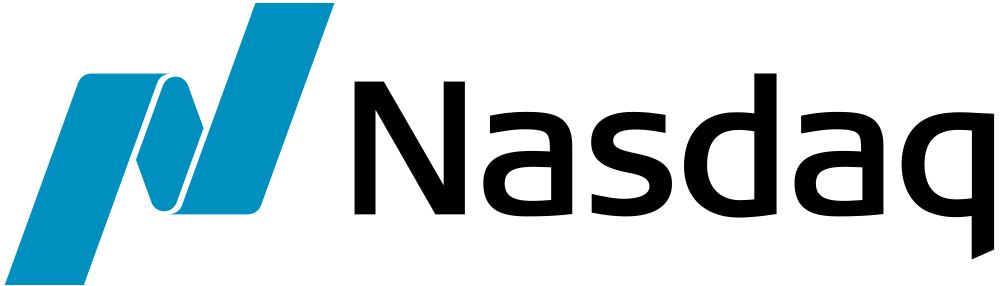

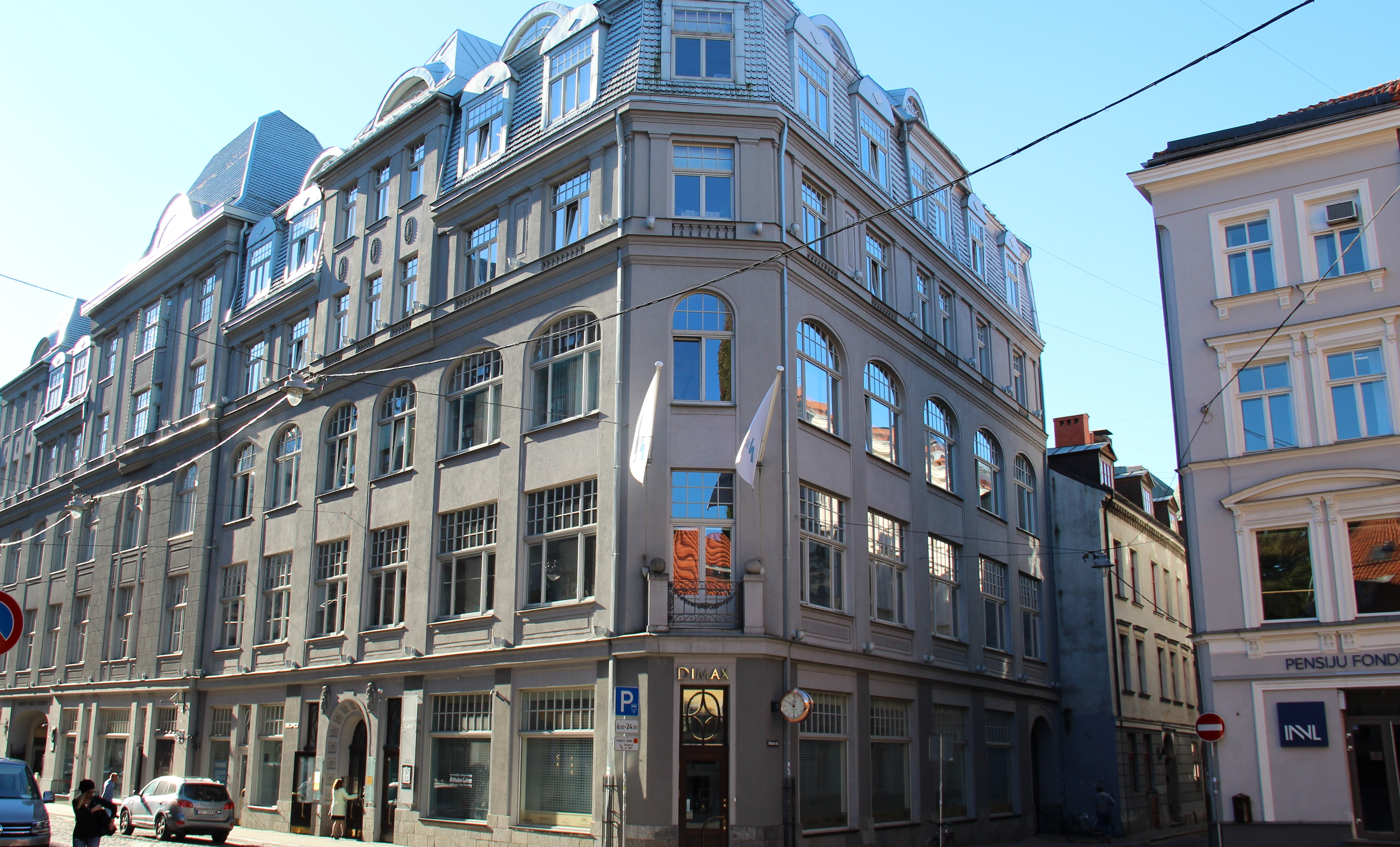
- Nasdaq CSD headquarters in Riga
- Company type: Societas Europaea
- Industry: Central securities depository
- Predecessor: Eesti Väärtpaberikeskus; Latvijas Centrālais depozitārijs; Lietuvos centrinis vertybinių popierių depozitoriumas; Verðbréfaskráning Íslands
- Founded: September 18, 2017; 8 years ago
- Headquarters: Riga, Latvia
- Area served: Estonia, Iceland, Latvia, Lithuania
- Key people: Indars Aščuks (Chairperson and CEO)
- Revenue: €16.54 million (2024)
- Net income: 3,896,381 euro (2022)
- Total assets: €76.9 billion assets under custody (2024)
- Number of employees: 56 (2022)
- Parent: Nasdaq, Inc.
- Website: nasdaqcsd.com

Nasdaq CSD is a regional central securities depository (CSD) for Estonia, Iceland, Latvia, and Lithuania. As part of Nasdaq, Inc., it provides post-trade infrastructure for the securities markets in those countries. The depository administers securities and settles trades in shares, bonds, and other financial instruments.

== History ==
Following the restoration of independence in the 1990s, Latvia, Lithuania, and Estonia established national central securities depositories. The Central Securities Depository of Lithuania (CSDL) was launched in 1994, with similar institutions created in Estonia and Latvia. By the 2000s, these CSDs became part of the Nasdaq group but operated independently.

On 18 September 2017, Nasdaq merged the CSDs of Estonia, Latvia, and Lithuania to form Nasdaq CSD SE, a Societas Europaea registered in Riga. The merger was influenced by the EU's Central Securities Depositories Regulation (CSDR) and the TARGET2-Securities (T2S) platform. Nasdaq CSD was the first CSD licensed under the CSDR. The headquarters was established in Riga, with branches in Tallinn and Vilnius. The new entity also joined the T2S settlement system.

The Icelandic Securities Depository (Icelandic: Verðbréfaskráning Íslands hf.) began its operations on 29 June 2000 and was established by the Central Bank of Iceland and various other Icelandic market participants. In 2006 OMX AB acquired all shares in the Icelandic CSD and later OMX AB became part of the Nasdaq Nordic group in 2007. In 2015, the Icelandic CSD changed its name to Nasdaq verðbréfamiðstöð or Nasdaq CSD Iceland hf. In 2020, Nasdaq CSD Iceland was merged into Nasdaq CSD SE, which was announced on 25 May 2020. The Icelandic market's settlement system migrated to the Nasdaq CSD platform on 24 August 2020. Nasdaq CSD received regulatory approval under the EU’s CSD regulation (CSDR) to operate in Iceland.

== Operations ==
Nasdaq CSD SE is a Societas Europaea incorporated in Latvia, with a head office in Riga and branches in Estonia, Lithuania, and Iceland. It is a wholly owned subsidiary of Nasdaq through Nasdaq Nordic. The CSD is authorized under the EU's CSD Regulation and supervised by the financial regulators of Latvia, Estonia, and Lithuania, with the Icelandic branch overseen by Icelandic financial regulators and central bank.

The CSD's infrastructure is integrated with TARGET2-Securities (T2S), which it joined in 2017. Euro-denominated transactions from the Baltic markets are settled in central bank money via TARGET2 on T2S. Securities transactions in Icelandic króna in Nasdaq CSD’s Icelandic securities settlement system via the Central Bank of Iceland’s interbank system.

As of 2024, Nasdaq CSD held over €76.9 billion in securities and serviced over 7,986 issuers. It is a member of the European Central Securities Depositories Association (ECSDA) and Association of National Numbering Agencies (ANNA), and is responsible for the issuance and monitoring of ISIN's for Icelandic and Baltic securities.

== Services ==
Nasdaq CSD provides post-trade services, including the central safekeeping of securities and the maintenance of securities accounts. It facilitates the clearance and settlement of trades. Baltic market settlements are conducted via the TARGET2 payment system, while the platform also handles local currency settlements, such as the Icelandic króna.

The CSD also provides various issuer and investor services. It manages the registration of new securities and administers corporate actions, such as dividend distribution, interest payments, and corporate events like stock splits. It also handles proxy voting and general meeting services.

Other services include maintaining shareholder registers, providing cross-border links to other CSDs, assigning ISIN codes as the national numbering agency, and operating a Legal Entity Identifier (LEI) issuance service. The CSD also provides data services and market statistics.
