= National Securities Depository (Poland) =

Polish financial market infrastructure

Coordinates: 52.2300°N 21.0237°E

The National Securities Depository (Polish: Krajowy Depozyt Papierów Wartościowych, KDPW) is a Polish financial market infrastructure that operates a central counterparty clearing house branded KDPW_CCP, a central securities depository, and a trade repository.

== Overview ==
KDPW had originally operated as a department of the Polish Stock Exchange from 1991, then became a joint-stock company in November 1994. Since then, it has been owned by three shareholders, each of which holds one-third of KDPW's equity capital: the Polish Ministry of Treasury, the Warsaw Stock Exchange, and the National Bank of Poland.

KDPW holds securities in uncertificated (dematerialized) form. It participates in the Association of National Numbering Agencies and in the European Central Securities Depositories Association.

== See also ==
- TARGET2-Securities
- CCP Global
