= KELER Group =

Hungarian financial market infrastructure

- Native name: Központi ELszámolóház és ÉRtéktár
- Company type: State-owned enterprise
- Industry: Financial services
- Founded: 1993; 33 years ago
- Headquarters: Budapest, Hungary
- Area served: Hungary
- Products: Central securities depository, and central counterparty clearing house
- Owner: Hungarian National Bank (MNB)
- Website: www.keler.hu

The KELER Group (for Központi ELszámolóház és ÉRtéktár, lit. 'Central Clearing House and Depository') is a Hungarian financial market infrastructure provider based in Budapest. It consists of two companies: KELER CSD, a central securities depository established in 1993; and KELER CCP, a central counterparty clearing house established in 2008. The KELER Group is majority-owned by the Hungarian National Bank (MNB).

KELER provides the central infrastructure of Hungarian securities markets. For example, all trades concluded on the Budapest Stock Exchange (BSE) must by law be settled at KELER.

== Overview ==
KELER CSD is owned by the MNB (53.33 percent) and the BSE (46.67 percent). KELER CCP is in turn mainly owned by KELER CSD (99.81 percent), with the MNB holding 0.1 percent and the BSE holding 0.09 percent. In 2015, the MNB also acquired majority control of the BSE, in which it held an equity stake of 81.35 percent as of 29 August 2024.

KELER CSD has been connected to TARGET2-Securities since 2017. In addition to ownership, both KELER CSD and KELER CCP are under the MNB's oversight.

== See also ==
- European Central Securities Depositories Association
- CCP Global
