= Bulgarian National Bank Government Securities Settlement System =

Financial market infrastructure

The Bulgarian National Bank Government Securities Settlement System (BNBGSSS), sometimes referred to as the Government Securities Depository (GSD), is one of two central securities depositories (CSDs) in Bulgaria, together with Central Depository AD. The main CSD for Bulgarian government securities, it is owned and operated by the Bulgarian National Bank.

BNBGSSS is one of three remaining central-bank-operated CSDs in the European Exchange Rate Mechanism that are mainly aimed at deposits of government securities, together with the National Bank of Belgium Securities Settlement System (NBB-SSS) and the Bank of Greece Securities Settlement System (BOGS). Other euro-area countries had similar systems in the past but have phased them out, e.g. France in 1995, Finland in 1996, Italy in 2000, and Spain in 2003.

== Overview ==
BNBGSSS was established in 1992. As it is operated by a National Central Bank of the Eurosystem, the BNBGSSS is exempt from authorization requirements that apply to other CSDs.

BNBGSSS connected to the Eurosystem's TARGET2-Securities (T2S) platform on 11 September 2023, following an agreement between the BNB and ECB signed on 22 December 2022.

== See also ==
- Financial market infrastructure
