= National Settlement Depository (Russia) =

The National Settlement Depository (NSD), headquartered in Moscow, is a Russian non-bank financial institution and central securities depository (CSD). It provides depository, settlement (bank account), and related services to financial market entities. Its services cover both securities listed in Russia's 2011 Federal Law "On the Central Securities Depository", and other Russian and foreign equity and debt securities. NSD is the CSD of the Russian Federation, and was assigned CSD status by the Russian Federal Financial Markets Service in 2012. It is the largest securities depository in Russia by market value of equity and debt securities held in custody, which in June 2022 were 70 trillion roubles ($1.12 trillion). It is a member of the Moscow Exchange Group. In March 2022, in the wake of the 2022 Russian invasion of Ukraine, NSD's accounts were blocked and frozen at international CSDs Euroclear Bank and Clearstream Banking SA (CSDs which together held €50tn of assets on behalf of investors). In addition, the European Union added NSD to its sanctions list, blocking NSD's accounts in euros, and in Euroclear and Clearstream; as a result, NSD could not service forex-denominated bonds issued by Russia and Russian companies. NSD suspended transactions in euros.

== History ==
On 27 June 1996, MICEX Settlement House was incorporated, which was a credit organization that provided settlement (bank account) services, including cash settlement services for trades in the financial market. MICEX Settlement House's primary business was to provide settlement services in the stock exchange markets operated by the MICEX Group.

National Depository Center (NDC) was incorporated on 21 January 1997. NDC was established to serve as the principal securities depository in the government securities market, and started acting in such capacity in March 1998. The same year, NDC started providing services for corporate, sub-federal, and municipal securities. NDC gained the leading position in the Russian debt securities market, and then started growing the scope of transactions with shares, investment units, and Eurobonds. As a result, NDC became the largest Russian settlement depository by value of assets in custody, and the only Russian settlement depository that covered all types of Russian equity and debt securities.

On 3 November 2010, an entry was made in the Unified State Register of Legal Entities concerning the reorganization of MICEX Settlement House through merger with NDC, which resulted in the establishment of National Settlement Depository (NSD), a unique organization for Russia.

On 6 November 2012, NSD was assigned the central securities depository (CSD) status by Russian Federal Financial Markets Service's Order No. 12-2761/pz-i dated 6 November 2012. In accordance with Article 22 (paragraph 5) of the Russian CSD Law, Russian CSD status may be granted to one organization only. In 2014, following an analysis of all financial market infrastructure organizations operating in Russia, the Bank of Russia recognized NSD as a systemically important central securities depository, systemically important settlement depository, and systemically important trade repository. On 25 December 2012, the NSD Payment System was recognized by the Bank of Russia as a systemically important payment system, and on 16 July 2012 – as a nationally important payment system.

== Ownership and management ==
NSD's majority shareholder is the Moscow Exchange, holding a 99.997% interest in NSD's share capital. The remaining shares are owned by a number of banks and securities market participants. On 30 June 2011, the Shareholders Agreement with respect to NSD was signed, which secured for NSD's customers the right to participate in managing NSD and ensured a balance between the interests of NSD's majority and minority shareholders. Under the Shareholders Agreement, up to five major customers of NSD may become its shareholders every year, thus becoming entitled to participate in managing the company.

The Chairman of NSD's Executive Board is Eddie Astanin. The Chairperson of NSD's Supervisory Board is Bella Zlatkis.

== Business ==
=== Central Securities Depository ===
NSD is the central securities depository in the Russian stock market, and provides services with respect to securities both in the capacity of the CSD under Russian Federal Law No. 414-FZ dated 7 December 2011 "On the Central Securities Depository", and in the capacity of a nominee holder of other Russian and foreign equity or debt securities. NSD provides services for the safekeeping of global certificates and depository recordkeeping of 100% of Russian federal loan bond (OFZ) issues, and 99% of Russian corporate and regional (sub-federal or municipal) bond issues.

In 2014, the large international securities depositories Euroclear Bank and Clearstream Banking SA gained full access to the Russian securities market, thus providing non-Russian companies and investment funds with investment opportunities. In 2014, in compliance with the FATCA requirements, NSD was registered with the U.S. Internal Revenue Service and was assigned a Global Intermediary Identification Number.

NSD says it meets all of the requirements to "eligible securities depositories" and satisfies the criteria set out by Rule 17f-7 of the U.S. Investment Company Act of 1940.

The Bank for International Settlements noted in 2015 that though the Bank of Russia has recommended that CSDs observe the "Principles for financial market infrastructures: Disclosure framework and assessment methodology," there was in fact no legal requirement that they do so. It also noted that the NSD did not have in place arrangements to alert non-Russian regulators to certain information, and did not have in place certain information-sharing with non-Russian CSD regulators on an automatic basis. It noted as well that NSD had not been in contact with non-Russian relevant regulatory authorities, such as those in the US and Europe.

=== Withholding agent ===
Since 2014, in accordance with the Russian Tax Code, NSD has been acting as a withholding agent when paying out income on Russian equity or debt securities.

=== Trade repository ===
On 1 October 2013, NSD started acting as a trade repository for all trade types (such as repo contracts, OTC derivative contracts, and other contract types entered into under a master agreement, as defined in Article 51.5 (paragraph 6) of the Russian Federal Law "On the Securities Market").

NSD's Trade Repository:

- Gathers and registers information on derivative and repo contracts entered into under master agreements. As part of the first phase of the Trade Repository launch, NSD registers repo and currency swap contracts;
- Keeps a register of registered contracts;
- Provides confirmations of registered contracts to clients or the Russian regulator; and
- Is charged with ensuring the integrity and security of information.

By the end of 2014, the number of Trade Repository clients reached 1,130 market participants who registered, in aggregate, 138,000 reports on master agreements and trades.

=== Payment system ===
As a systemically important payment system, the NSD Payment System was assessed by the Bank of Russia for observance of the international standards, namely the Principles for Financial Market Infrastructures issued by the Committee on Payment and Settlement Systems of the Bank for International Settlements and the International Organization of Securities Commissions (CPMI-IOSCO) and recommended by the Bank of Russia for observance by Russian important payment systems.

In 2014, the number of cash transfers to or from clients' bank accounts held with NSD was 998.39 thousand; the total amount of RUB cash transfers to or from clients' bank accounts held with NSD was RUB 298.06 trillion; and the total amount of foreign currency cash transfers to or from clients' bank accounts held with NSD was equivalent to RUB 9.62 trillion.

=== Clearing and collateral management ===
NSD offers collateral management services for tri-party repo transactions with the Bank of Russia or the Russian Federal Treasury. Trades are entered not with an individual security, but rather with a basket of securities.

To clear trades, NSD applies a variety of settlement models, including DVP-1, DVP-2, and DVP-3. Delivery versus payment or DVP is a form of settlement for securities that involves simultaneous delivery of securities by the seller to the buyer and cash by the buyer to the seller. The service is based on NSD's clearing platform that allows for making DVP transactions in more than one clearing session, with securities being settled on a gross basis and cash being settled on a net basis (DVP-2); or with net settlement of both securities and cash (DVP-3); or outside clearing sessions with settlement on a trade by trade basis (DVP-1). The DVP settlement mechanism allowed clients to settle trades both in Russian rubles and—until 2022—non-Russian currencies (USD or Euro).

NSD offers the opportunity to settle trades on a DVP basis using correspondent accounts with the Bank of Russia via the Real Time Gross Settlement System (BESP). With the launch of the electronic matching service, NSD's clients were provided with the opportunity to receive information on the availability of potentially matching instructions, i.e., unmatched instructions that differ from each in one data field. NSD says that the Hold & Release functionality offered by NSD contributes to greater reliability of settlements and their control by clients.

The number of Bank of Russia's repo transactions with a basket of securities was 3,727 in 2013, and 8,858 in 2014. The value of Bank of Russia's repo transactions with a basket of securities amounted to RUB 14.04 trillion in 2013, and RUB 57.22 trillion in 2014.

=== National Numbering Agency ===
NSD acts as the National Numbering Agency for Russia and the Substitute Numbering Agency for the CIS countries and as such assigns ISINs and CFIs to securities or other financial instruments issued or registered in Russia or other CIS countries.

== International ==
=== 2014-21; early years ===
- In September 2013, CSD.Austria, the Austrian central securities depository, and NSD established an international direct link to the Russian securities market. As a result, Austrian and international custodian banks holding securities accounts at CSD.Austria obtained the opportunity to make direct settlement of Russian securities and hold them using CSD.Austrias' foreign nominee account opened with NSD, and NSD expanded its access to potential foreign investors.
- In November 2013, the U.S. Internal Revenue Service, the agency of the United States federal government responsible for tax collection and tax law enforcement, signed an agreement with NSD recognizing it as a Qualified Intermediary (QI).
- In December 2013, NSD and BNY Mellon joined forces to help Russian-based investors trade depositary receipts.
- In 2013, FTSE Global Markets named NSD among 20 most influential financial market players in 2013.
- In 2014, the large international securities depositories Euroclear Bank and Clearstream Banking SA gained full access to the Russian securities market, providing foreign companies and investment funds with investment opportunities, and provided issuers in the Russian securities market with investors. First, in spring 2013, they started settling trades with Russian federal loan bonds (OFZ), before accessing the Russian corporate bonds market in January 2014.
- In 2014, NSD opened a foreign nominee account to the central securities depositories of Armenia and Kyrgyzstan.
- In 2014, Thomas Murray Data Services, the specialist custody rating, risk management, and research firm, issued a CSD rating for NSD at AA−, which translated as 'very low Overall Risk', with 'Stable' outlook.

=== 2022-present; after-effects of Russian invasion of Ukraine ===
- On March 16, 2022, Thomas Murray downgraded NSD's rating to B.
- On March 18, 2022, NSD's accounts were blocked and frozen at Euroclear and Clearstream (CSDs which together held €50tn of assets on behalf of investors).
- In March 2022, the European Central Securities Depositories Association (ECSDA) suspended NSD from membership in the association.
- In June 2022, the European Union added NSD to its sanctions list, blocking NSD's accounts in euros, and in Euroclear and Clearstream; as a result, NSD was not able to service forex-denominated bonds issued by Russia and Russian companies.
- Also in June 2022, the NSD suspended transactions in euros.

== Performance ==
In 2014, NSD's net income under IFRS amounted to RUB 3.31 bln, and NSD's revenues under IFRS reached RUB 6.62 bln. As at 31 December 2014, the value of securities held in securities accounts with NSD was RUB 24.94 trillion, which was 14% higher than as at 31 December 2013 (RUB 21.8 trillion). The value of foreign securities held in NSD's clients' securities accounts exceeded RUB 2.7 trillion.

In June 2022, the NSD custodied 70 trillion roubles ($1.12 trillion) worth of client assets, including 9 trillion roubles of foreign securities such as Eurobonds linked to the Russian government.

== See also ==
- Russian National Wealth Fund
- Russian Direct Investment Fund

== Articles ==
- Why Russia remains upbeat on its partnership with China // Hong Kong Economic Journal, 12 September 2015
- WNSD implements back-to-back securities settlement technology // Finextra, 10 September 2015
- Russia Mimics Euroclear With China Market Link as Ties Grow // Bloomberg, 3 September 2015
- Boost for Russian Corporate Actions Reform // Inside Reference Data, 21 July 2015
- NSD improves procedures for counterparty checking using KYC // The Asian Banker, 16 July 2015
- Country profile. Russia // Asset Servicing Times, 17 June 2015
- Russian Central Depository Makes Corporate Actions Platform Customizable // Inside Reference Data, 28 May 2015
- NSD ‘broadly’ compliant with PFMIs // Asset Servicing Times, 20 May 2015
- NSD numbers tell mixed story // Global custody, 30 April 2015
- NSD upgrades services to ease access to the Russian market // FTSE Global Markets, 28 April 2015
- Russian CSD introduces new DVP service // Global Investor, 30 March 2015
- Russian CSD launches corporate action website // ISS Mag, 23 March 2015
- Moscow exchange gets insurance for settlement // Futures and Options World, 25 February 2015
- Russia's NSD sees growth everywhere // ISS Mag, 10 February 2015
- National Settlement Depository deputy chairwoman Maria Krasnova tells Joanna Wright how she is helping to bring the Russian depository up to international standards // Inside Reference Data, 7 January 2015
- Interview with Maria Krasnova, Deputy Chairman of the Board, about the reform of corporate actions in Russia // Asset Servicing Times, 12 December 2014
- Efforts being made to make the Russian markets more attractive // COOConnect, 3 December 2014
- NSD Launches Electronic Matching Service // GLOBAL CUSTODIAN, 20 November 2014
- Russia: Behind-the-Scenes Progress on Operational Risk // FinOps Report, 5 November 2014
- Russia's NSD launches pre-LEI website // FTSE Global Markets, 23 September 2014
- Only in Vienna – A Direct Link to the Russian Securities Market // International Securities Magazine, 18 June 2014
- Driving change in Russia's securities processing marketplace // Financial Services Research, 30 April 2014
- Opening up the capital markets // FTSE Global Markets, 25 March 2014
- Interviews with NSD top management. Interview with Eddie Astanin, Maria Krasnova, Maria Langouche // FTSE Global Markets, 12 March 2014
- Euroclear Opens Russia Company, Muni Debt to Foreigners Jan. 30 // Bloomberg, 22 January 2014
- Russia: Is the NSD Coming in from the Cold? // FinOps Report, 15 January 2014
