= Korea Securities Depository =

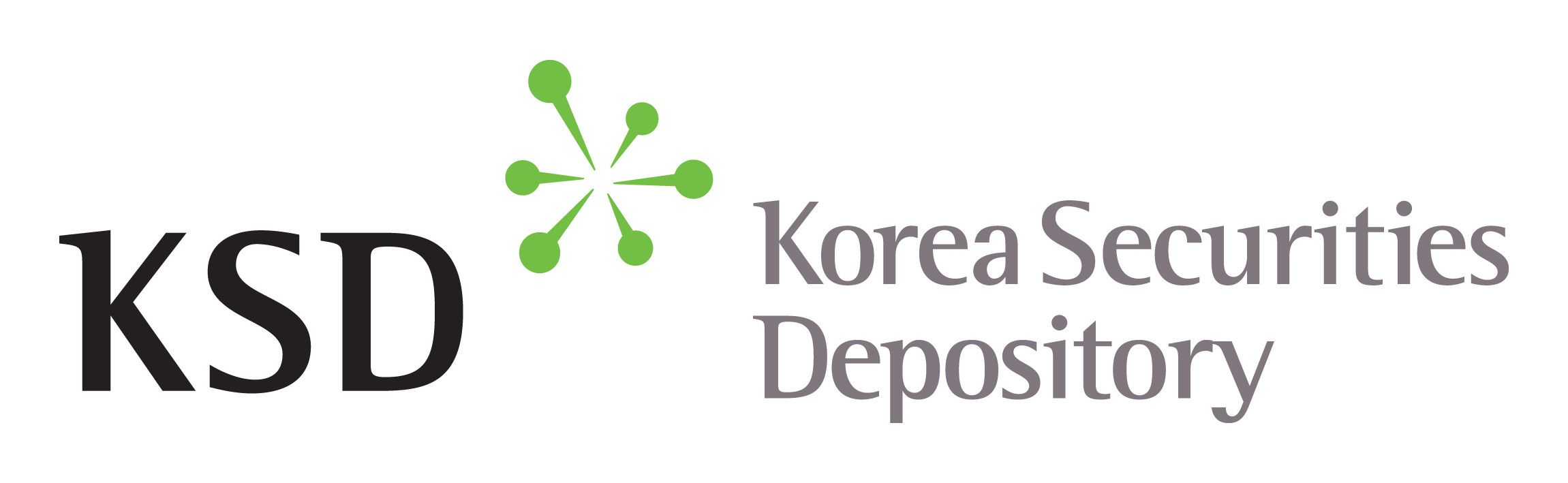
- Native name: 한국예탁결제원
- Company type: Central securities depository
- Founded: 6 December 1974
- Headquarters: 40 Munhyeongeumyung-ro, Nam-gu; Busan, South Korea
- Number of locations: Busan, Seoul and Ilsan; 2 branches Hong Kong office
- Key people: Lee Soonho (Chairman & CEO)
- Parent: Financial Services Commission
- Website: www.ksd.or.kr/eng

- Korea Securities Depository
- Hangul: 한국예탁결제원
- Hanja: 韓國預託決濟院
- RR: Hanguk yetak gyeoljewon
- MR: Han'guk yet'ak kyŏlchewŏn

Korea Securities Depository is the central securities depository (CSD) of Korea, providing central custody of securities, book-entry transfer, and settlement of securities transactions. KSD was established in December 6, 1974, under the Securities and Exchange Act (later consolidated into the Financial Investment Services and Capital Markets Act). It is a non-classified public institution under the Financial Services Commission (South Korea).

As of 2014, KSD held in custody securities valued at KRW 3,149 trillion, and processes a daily average of KRW 70 trillion in securities related cash.

== History ==
The rapid growth of the Korean securities market in the 1970s called for an efficient facility for the custody and settlement of securities. The 5th amendment the Securities and Exchange Act (SEA) on February 6, 1973 provided the legal grounds to implement a CSD system, and on December 6, 1974, the Korea Securities Settlement Corporation (KSSC) was established. On April 25, 1994, KSSC was re-incorporated as Korea Securities Depository (KSD), a special public corporation pursuant to the 11th amendment to the SEA (December 17, 1993). The amendment also provided a legal basis for KSD to act as the sole CSD of Korea. On February 9, 2010, with the enforcement of the Capital Market and Financial Investment Business Act, the name was changed to Korea Securities Depository(KSD).

== See also ==
- Asia-Pacific Central Securities Depository Group
