= Bratislava Stock Exchange =

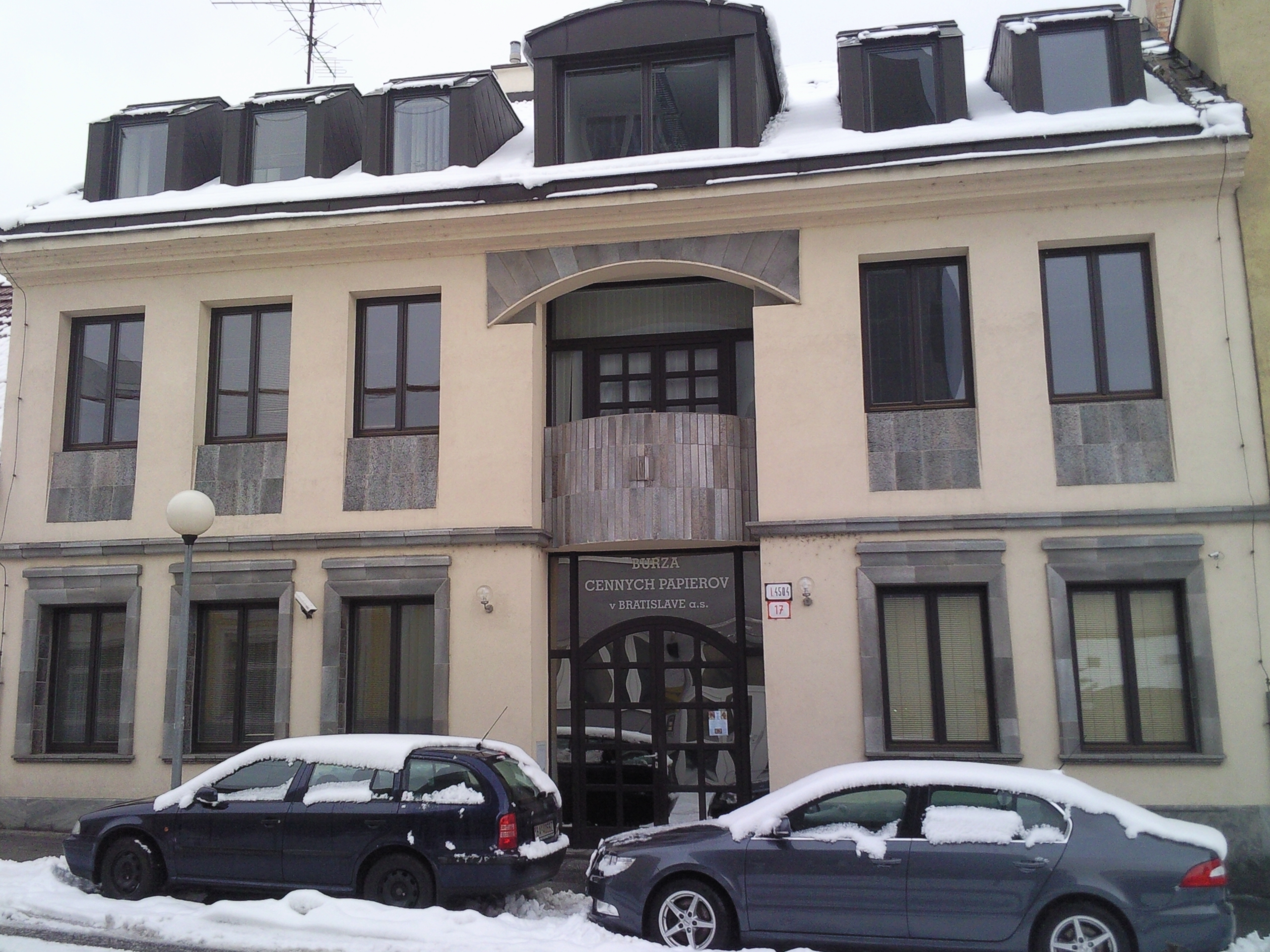
Bratislava Stock Exchange

Bratislava Stock Exchange (Slovak: Burza cenných papierov v Bratislave, abbr. BSSE, BCPB) is a stock exchange in Bratislava established on 15 March 1991 according to adjudication of Ministry of Finance of Slovakia in 1990. It is the only regulated securities market in Slovakia.

The BSSE owns and operates CDCP SR (Slovak: Centrálny depozitár cenných papierov Slovenskej republiky), a central securities depository established in 1992 and that has been connected with TARGET2-Securities since 2017.

The trading started at BSSE on 6 April 1993. The seat of the stock exchange is Vysoká 17, Bratislava.

In July 2025, the company acceded to EuroCTP, a joint venture with 14 other bourses, in an effort to provide a consolidated tape for the European Union, as part of the Capital Markets Union proposed by the European Commission.

== Index ==
The official stock index for the Bratislava Stock Exchange is SAX (abbr. from Slovenský akciový index; in Slovak: Slovak Share Index). It is a capital-weighted index based on a comparison of market capitalization selected set of shares with a market capitalization of the same set of the reference date. It is an index that reflects the overall change of assets associated with investing in shares, which are included in the index. It includes changes in prices as well as dividend income and income related to changes in the size of the share capital.

The initial value of the index is 100 points and binds to the date of the 14 September 1993.

=== Index composition ===
- Biotika, a.s.
- OTP Banka Slovensko, a.s.
- Slovenské energetické strojárne, a.s.
- Slovnaft, a.s.
- Všeobecná úverová banka, a.s.

== Index Tracking and International Connectivity ==
Passive exposure to the SAX index for international investors is possible through an exchange-traded fund - Expat Slovakia SAX UCITS ETF - listed in Frankfurt on Xetra (ticker: SK9A, ISIN: BGSKSAX04187) and traded in euro. The fund acts as a conduit for capital flows between the international financial markets and the capital market in Slovakia.
