= KDD Central Securities Clearing Corporation =

Financial market infrastructure

- Native name: Centralna Klirinško Depotna Družba
- Company type: State-owned enterprise
- Industry: Financial services
- Founded: January 10, 1995; 31 years ago
- Headquarters: Ljubljana, Slovenia
- Area served: Slovenia
- Products: Central securities depository
- Owner: Slovenian government and private sector participants
- Website: kdd.si

KDD Central Securities Clearing Corporation (Slovene: Centralna Klirinško Depotna Družba) is the central securities depository (CSD) of Slovenia.

== History ==
KDD was inaugurated on 10 January 1995. It started operations the next year, and moved into new business premises in 2002. As of 2016, the Slovenian government held 24 percent of KDD's equity capital, the rest being scattered among a range of private-sector participants.

In August 2013, KDD announced it would connect to TARGET2-Securities (T2S) using SWIFT. The connection to T2S was successfully implemented in February 2017.

== See also ==
- European Central Securities Depositories Association
