= Euroclear Sweden =

Financial market infrastructure

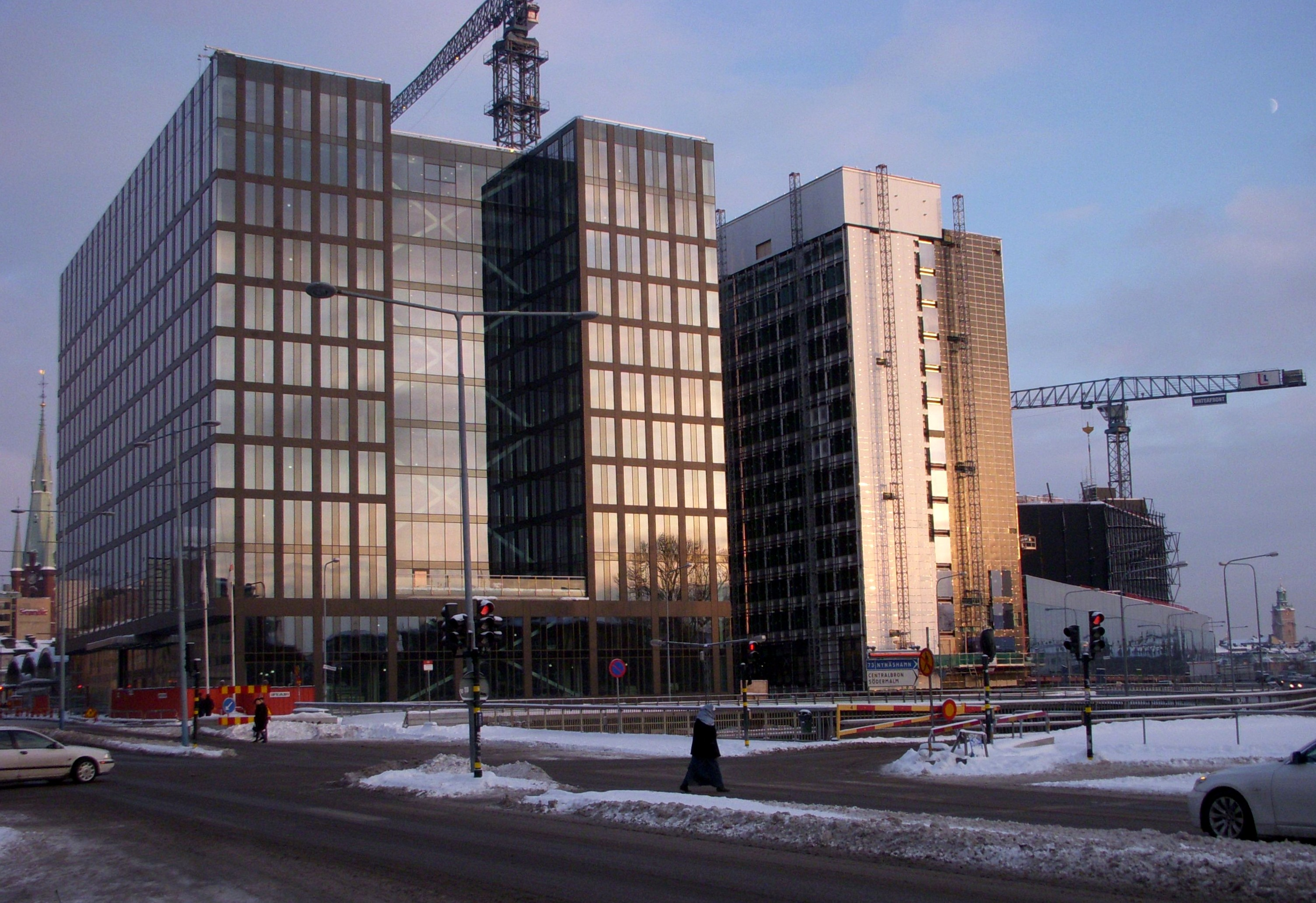
Building at Klarabergsviadukten 63, head office of Euroclear Sweden

Euroclear Sweden is the main central securities depository (CSD) in Sweden, headquartered in Stockholm. It is a fully owned subsidiary of the Euroclear Group.

== Overview ==
Värdepapperscentralen AB (VPC) was established in 1971 as the sole CSD for Sweden. It was owned jointly by Sweden's main banks: as of 2003, 98.6 percent of its capital was held by SEB, Handelsbanken, Nordea, and FöreningsSparbanken, with the residual 1.4 percent held by minor banks and investment firms.

On 22 April 2004, VPC announced its merger with its Finnish peer Arvopaperikeskus (APK) to form the Nordic Central Securities Depository (NCSD). As a consequence of the transaction, OM HEX AB, the owner of both the Finnish and Swedish stock exchanges, became owner of nearly 20 percent of NCSD, the rest remaining mainly owned by the four large Swedish banks. In subsequent years, the Swedish banks bought out the share of OM HEX, which had been renamed OMX in August 2004.

On 2 June 2008, Euroclear announced its acquisition of the NCSD, after which the CSDs in Finland and Sweden were respectively renamed Euroclear Finland and Euroclear Sweden.

== See also ==
- European Central Securities Depositories Association
