= Central Depository AD =

Bulgarian financial market infrastructure

The Central Depositary AD (CDAD) is one of two central securities depositories in Bulgaria, the other being the Bulgarian National Bank Government Securities Settlement System.

== Overview ==
CDAD was established as a joint-stock company on 13 August 1997. It committed to connecting to the TARGET2-Securities (T2S) securities settlement platform of the Eurosystem in October 2022.

CDAD's shareholders include the Bulgarian Ministry of Finance, the country's main banks and investment firms, and the Bulgarian Stock Exchange. The Ministry of Finance has the largest single stake at 43.7 percent. The Bulgarian National Bank was a shareholder until 2011, when it sold its 20 percent stake to the Ministry of Finance. Other shareholders may not hold more than 5 percent each.

== See also ==
- European Central Securities Depositories Association
