= Clearstream =

Financial market infrastructure

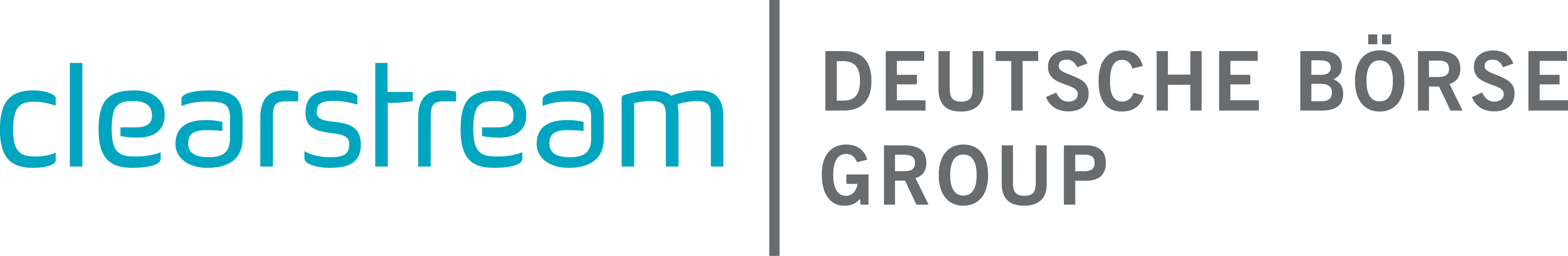

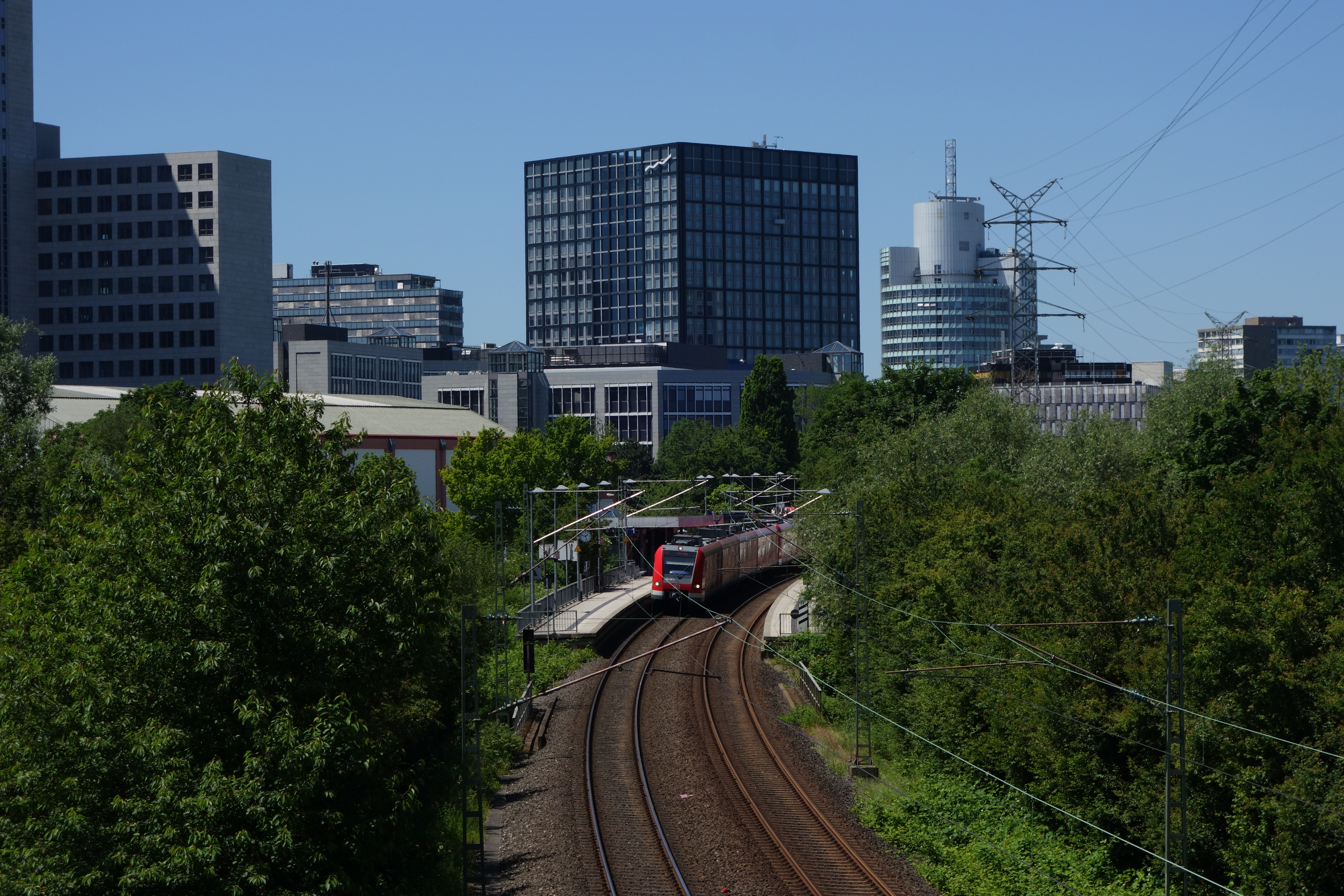
- The Cube building in Eschborn near Frankfurt, head office of Clearstream Holding AG and of the Deutsche Börse Group
- Type: Subsidiary
- Industry: Finance
- Founded: January 2000
- Headquarters: Luxembourg City, Luxembourg
- Products: (International) Central securities depository
- Members: 5,000+
- Parent: Deutsche Börse
- Website: http://www.clearstream.com

Clearstream or the Clearstream Group is the central securities depository arm of the Deutsche Börse Group. It provides settlement and custody as well as other related services for securities across all asset classes. Its subsidiary in Luxembourg, Clearstream Banking SA, is one of two world-leading International central securities depositories (ICSDs), the other one being Euroclear Bank. Both the main German national CSD, Clearstream Europe AG, and the national CSD of Luxembourg, LuxCSD, are also part of Clearstream. Clearstream Banking AG and Clearstream Banking SA are held via intermediate holding company Clearstream Holding AG.

As of 2017, Clearstream had around 2,500 customers in 110 countries.

The name "Clearstream" is often misinterpreted as indicating a clearing activity of the Clearstream Group, which is not the case as the clearing arm of Deutsche Börse is a separate entity, Eurex Clearing. This confusion comes from the name originating in a bygone era when securities clearing and settlement were often viewed as a single activity.

== History ==
Clearstream was formed in January 2000 through the merger of Cedel and Deutsche Börse Clearing. Initially a 50-50 joint venture between Cedel International and Deutsche Börse, it became a fully owned subsidiary of the latter on 1 July 2002.

In July 2010, Clearstream founded LuxCSD together with the Central Bank of Luxembourg (BCL), to act as a CSD for Luxembourg.

In December 2010, Clearstream co-founded REGIS-TR, a joint venture with the Spanish Central Securities Depository Iberclear, to act as a trade repository for derivatives transactions, helping participants meet their regulatory reporting obligations brought about by the introduction of the European Market Infrastructure Regulation (EMIR).

In 2021, Clearstream acquired full ownership of LuxCSD by buying out the BCL's 50 percent stake.

== Supervision ==
Based in Luxembourg and Germany, Clearstream is subject to the supervision of the regulatory authorities of these two countries. In Luxembourg, the Commission de Surveillance du Secteur Financier (CSSF) is the prudential regulator with authority over all banks and financial service providers. In Germany, Clearstream is regulated as a bank according to the German Banking Act ("Kreditwesengesetz") and is therefore subject to the prudential supervision of the German Federal Financial Supervisory Authority (German: "Bundesanstalt für Finanzdienstleistungsaufsicht" - BaFin). Moreover, Clearstream is regulated in each market where it has operational centres, for example by the Monetary Authority of Singapore.

As the operator of securities settlement systems in both Luxembourg and Germany, Clearstream is additionally regulated by the central banks of these two countries, namely the Banque centrale du Luxembourg and the Deutsche Bundesbank.

== Operations ==
Clearstream accepts central banks and AML-regulated credit institutions (such as regulated banks) as customers. Clearstream does not accept natural persons as customers and no account is opened in the name of a natural person.

Clearstream has operational centres in Cork, Cardiff, Luxembourg, Prague, and Singapore. It also maintains representative offices in London, Hong Kong, Tokyo, Dubai, New York, and Zurich.

=== Asset Services ===
Clearstream is responsible for the management, safekeeping/custody and administration of securities (assets) under custody. Services include income and redemption payments, corporate actions as well as tax and proxy voting.

The majority of securities safekept by Clearstream are immobilised. Securities are reflected in book-entry form in the accounts of customers at Clearstream regardless of whether they are held in physical or dematerialised form. This means that they are no longer represented by physical certificates, but instead by data entered into the Clearstream systems.

=== Global Securities Financing ===
Securities financing is the ability to borrow or lend cash or securities against collateral. In securities financing, collateral comprises assets given as a guarantee by a borrower to secure a securities loan and subject to seizure in the event of default. Collateral management refers to the handling of all tasks related to the monitoring of collateral posted by a borrower to meet a financial obligation (optimisation, substitution, top-up, withdrawal, settlement instruction, reporting, processing of margin calls and returns, notification of corporate events, etc.).

Clearstream's collateral management, securities lending and borrowing services are gathered under the Global Liquidity Hub. It provides a pool of liquidity through links to agent banks, trading platforms, clearing houses and other market infrastructures.

Clearstream is a member of the Liquidity Alliance, which was established in January 2013 as a platform for CSDs to collaborate on collateral management. It was founded by ASX, CETIP, Clearstream, Iberclear and Strate.

=== Investment Fund Services ===
Clearstream has developed the world's largest cross-border fund processing platform, called Vestima. It handles all types of funds, from mutual funds to exchange-traded funds (ETFs) and hedge funds.

In addition to providing access to all fund types, Vestima supports their cross-border distribution. Services offered by Vestima include order routing, centralised delivery versus payment (DVP) settlement, safekeeping, asset servicing and collateral management.

=== Issuance ===
ICSDs and CSDs are often used to bring a security issue to the market, as they possess the necessary infrastructure for distributing the securities to the investors as well as for settlement and safekeeping. Clearstream's ICSD also provides custody services, which means that the security can be serviced throughout its entire lifecycle. Clearstream provides the infrastructure which enables issuers to reach investors worldwide.

Clearstream's services include eligibility assessments, issuance and distribution of domestic, foreign and international (i.e. Eurobonds) new issues of global and domestic instruments: certificates of deposit, depository receipts, treasury bills, commercial papers, short-term and medium-term notes, bonds, equities, warrants, equity-linked notes and investment fund shares.

=== Settlement ===
Clearstream's ICSD settles trades in international securities and in domestic securities traded across borders. The CSDs settle domestic transactions in the German and Luxembourgish markets. Transactions between the two ICSDs Clearstream Banking SA and Euroclear Bank are settled via an electronic communications platform, called the Bridge.

Clearstream operates a delivery versus payment settlement system, ensuring simultaneous settlement of securities and cash transfers on a gross (trade-by-trade) basis. This helps to minimise the risk associated with the settlement of securities.

== Clearstream and Iranian oil revenues ==
In the late 2000s, it was revealed that Clearstream held approximately $2.8 billion in securities on behalf of the Central Bank of Iran (CBI) through an account in the United States. This arrangement potentially violated U.S. sanctions against Iran, leading to legal scrutiny.

In 2014, Clearstream agreed to a $152 million settlement with the U.S. Department of the Treasury's Office of Foreign Assets Control (OFAC) for these violations. The settlement addressed Clearstream's role in providing the Iranian government with unauthorized access to the U.S. financial system by holding securities for the CBI.

=== Legal Disputes Over Frozen Iranian Assets ===
Beyond the settlement, Clearstream has been embroiled in ongoing legal disputes concerning Iranian assets frozen under international sanctions. In 2008, approximately $4.9 billion in Iranian assets were frozen by Clearstream following U.S. pressure. Subsequent legal actions have sought to release or claim these funds.

Notably, in 2018, Iran's central bank sued Clearstream to recover the frozen assets. However, U.S. courts have ruled in favor of using portions of these funds to compensate victims of terrorist attacks attributed to Iranian-backed entities, such as the 1983 bombing of the U.S. Marine barracks in Beirut.

=== Involvement of Sepehr Energy ===
Sepehr Energy, an Iranian state-affiliated oil company, has been implicated in efforts to access the frozen funds held by Clearstream. Reports indicate that executives from Sepehr Energy have been involved in legal and diplomatic initiatives aimed at reclaiming these assets. The company has also been sanctioned by the U.S. for allegedly facilitating oil sales that fund Iran's military and associated groups.

== Leadership ==
- Edmond Israel, Cedel Chairman 1970-1990
- André Lussi, Cedel Managing Director 1989-1999 and Clearstream CEO 2000-2001
- Hans Angermüller, Cedel Chairman 1990-1994
- Robert Douglass, Cedel Chairman 1994-1999 and Clearstream Chairman 2000-2004
- André Roelants, Clearstream CEO 2001-2004 and Chairman 2004-2010
- Jeffrey Tessler, Clearstream CEO 2004-2015 and Chairman 2015-2018
- Stephan Leithner, Clearstream Chairman 2018-2024

== See also ==
- Clearstream affair
- Majid Azami
- Sepehr Energy Jahan
- Persian Gulf Star Oil Company (PGSOC)
- Jey Oil Refining Company
- List of banks in the euro area
- List of banks in Germany
