= Strate (CSD) =

South African financial infrastructure

Strate (for Share Transactions Totally Electronic Limited) is the main central securities depository (CSD) in South Africa.

== Overview ==
In 1989, the South African Reserve Bank partnered with the country's major banks to create UNEXCor, an electronic settlement system for the South African bond market. Two years later, Central Depository Limited (CD Ltd) was established to provide electronic settlement and depository services. In May 1994, UNEXCor became a clearing house for the bond market.

The initiative to create Strate started in 1996 and led to its incorporation in November 1998. On 10 September 1999, a shareholders' was made between Absa Bank, Citibank, First National Bank, JSE Limited, Mercantile Bank, Nedbank and Standard Bank to define the objectives assigned to Strate. UNEXCor was subsequently merged into Strate in 2003. Subsequently, Strate has been owned by the JSE (44.55 percent), Nedbank and Standard Bank (15 percent each), Absa and FirstRand Bank (12.68 percent each), and Citibank (0.10 percent).

Strate handles the settlement of a number of securities, including equities and bonds for the Johannesburg Stock Exchange (JSE), as well as a range of derivative products such as warrants, exchange-traded funds (ETFs), retail notes and tracker funds. It has now added the settlement of money market securities to its portfolio of services. It provides services to issuers for their investors in terms of the Companies Act and Securities Services Act (SSA) of 2004.n In 2013, Strate announced a partnership with Euroclear.

Strate is a member of both the Africa & Middle East Depositories Association (AMEDA) and the Americas Central Securities Depositories Association (ACSDA).

== See also ==
- Financial market infrastructure
