= Oesterreichische Kontrollbank =

Specialized bank in Austria

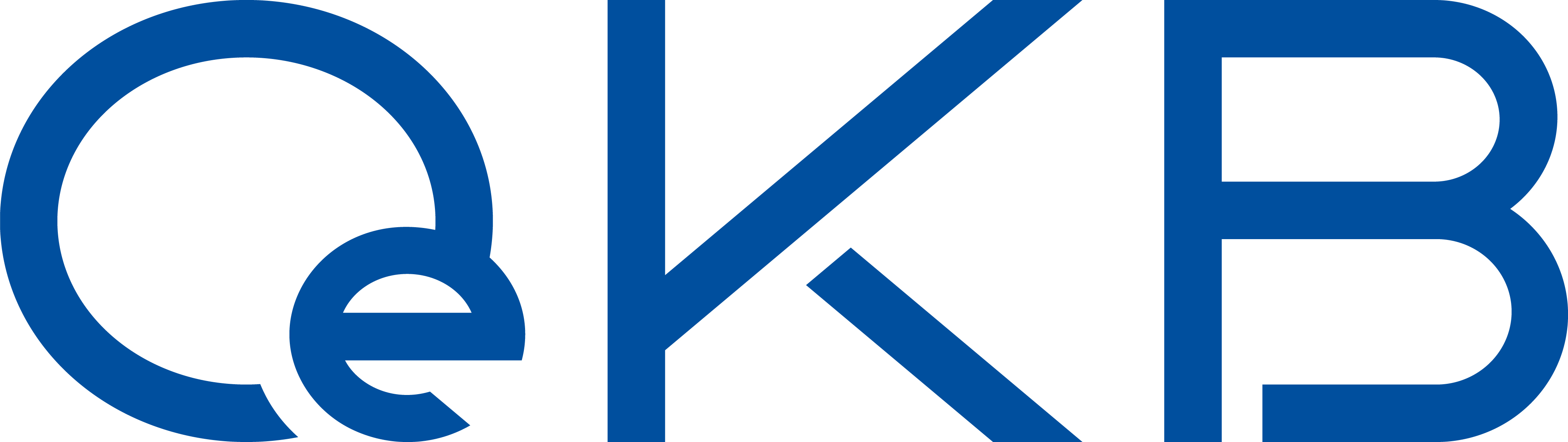

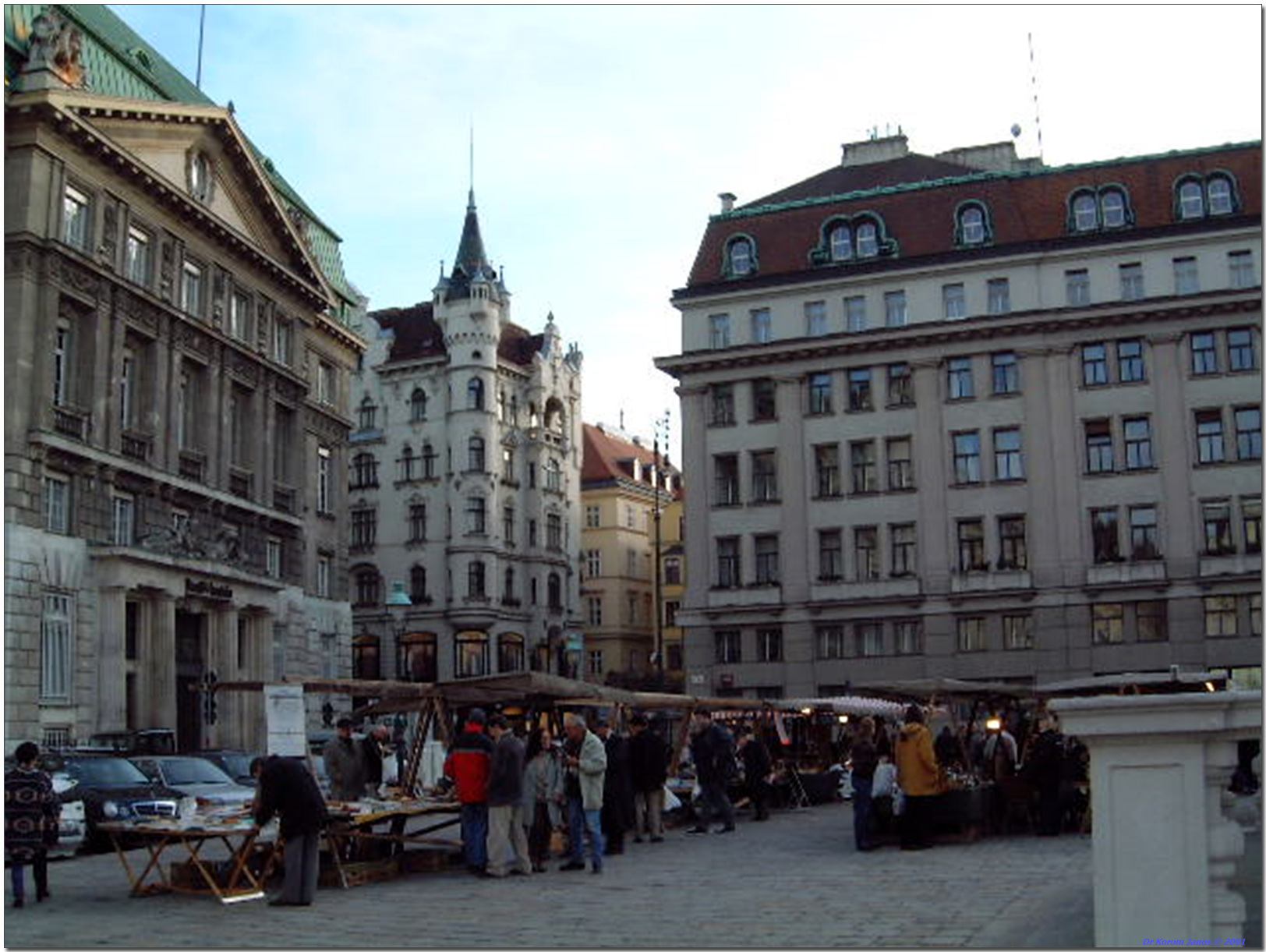
- Building at Am Hof 4 (right), one of OeKB's two historic head office buildings in Vienna, former seat of Zentralbank Deutscher Sparkassen
- Type: Public company (Aktiengesellschaft)
- Industry: Financial services
- Founded: 1946; 80 years ago
- Headquarters: Vienna, Austria
- Area served: Austria
- Products: Central counterparty, export credit agency, development bank
- Owner: Commercial banks in Austria
- Website: www.oekb.at

The Oesterreichische Kontrollbank (OeKB, lit. 'Austrian Control Bank') is a special-purpose financial institution in Austria, headquartered in Vienna. It was founded in 1946 and is owned by Austria's main banks. While technically a private-sector organization, part of its activity is carried out on behalf of the Austrian government and accordingly backed by the state budget.

The OeKB Group's main subsidiaries include Acredia Versicherung AG in export services; OeKB CSD GmbH and Central Counterparty Austria (CCP.A) in capital market infrastructure; Oesterreichische Entwicklungsbank AG (OeEB) in development finance; and Österreichische Hotel- und Tourismusbank (ÖHT) in tourism services. OeKB also has significant activities in the energy sector.

== History ==
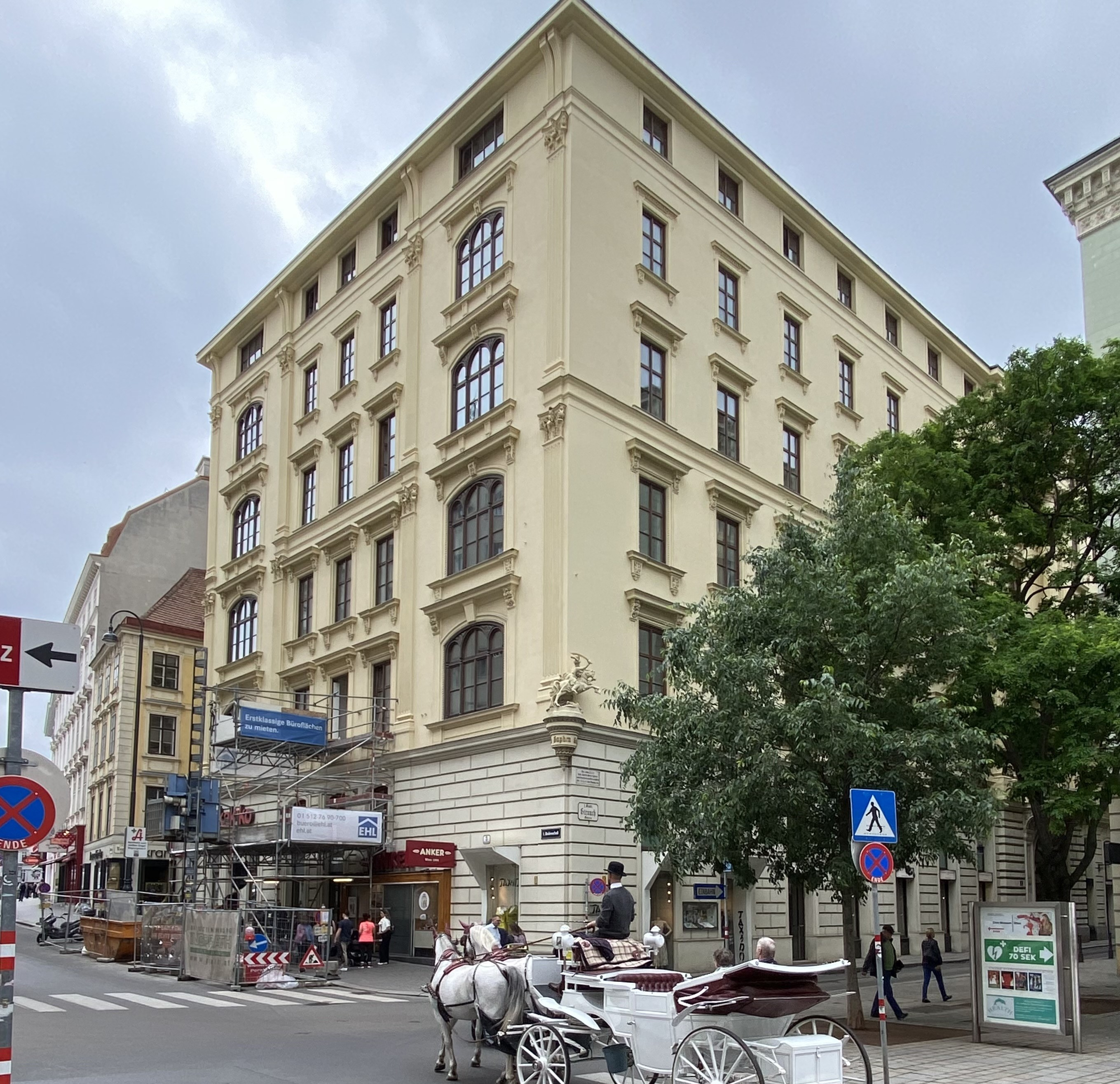
Building at Strauchgasse 3 in Vienna, the other historic head office building of OeKB, former seat of Anglo-Austrian Bank

OeKB was established on 22 January 1946 by the main surviving banks in the re-established Republic of Austria (which had been an integral part of Nazi Germany from 1938 to 1945), namely Creditanstalt-Bankverein, Österreichische Länderbank, Österreichisches Credit-Institut as well as private banks Schoeller & Co. and Pinschof & Co. The OeKB was given various tasks associated with postwar emergencies and the reconstruction of a national finance and capital markets infrastructure in Austria, including by taking over the activity of the former Wiener Giro- und Cassen-Verein, established in 1872 and described as the world's oldest central securities depository (CSD).

In 1949, OeKB became the central securities depository of the Vienna Stock Exchange, forming the basis for its capital market services arm. In 1950, it started insuring exports on behalf of the Austrian state.

In 1998, OeKB purchased 70 percent of the Oesterreichischer Exportfonds, which had been established in 1950. In 2004, it established Central Counterparty Austria (CCP.A) by merging the cash market clearing it had provided to the Austrian stock market since 1949 with the futures market clearing system initiated by Wiener Börse in 1991. In 2008, it brought its development finance activities into Oesterreichische Entwicklungsbank. In 2014, OeKB partnered with Euler Hermes to form export credit insurer Acredia Versicherung. In 2015, OeKB CSD was established as a separate fully owned entity. In 2019, OeKB acquired a 68.75 percent equity stake in the Austrian Hotel and Tourism Bank (ÖHT, est. 1947) from Bank Austria and Erste Group.

== Group structure ==
Oesterreichische Kontrollbank AG is the full owner of OeEB (development finance) and OeKB CSD GmbH (central securities depository). It owns 68,75 percent of OeHT (tourism finance), the other 31,25 percent belonging to Raiffeisenbank International AG; 51 percent of Acredia Insurance, the other 49 percent belonging to Allianz; and 50 percent of CCP.A, the other 50 percent belonging to Wiener Börse. In the energy sector, its investments include 20 percent of AGCS Gas Clearing and Settlement AG and 17 percent of APCS Power Clearing and Settlement AG.

In energy, the OeKB acts as a general clearing member of European Commodity Clearing, Europe's leading energy clearing house.

== Ownership ==
As of early 2025, the shareholders of OeKB were as follows:

- UniCredit: 49.14 percent
- Erste Group: 12.89 percent
- AVZ GmbH, successor entity to the former Zentralsparkasse: 8.25 percent
- Raiffeisen Bank International: 8.12 percent
- BAWAG (via PSK Beteiligungsverwaltung GmbH): 5.09 percent
- Raiffeisen Banking Group (via Raiffeisen OeKB Beteiligungsgesellschaft mbH): 5.00 percent
- Oberbank: 3.89 percent
- Bank für Tirol und Vorarlberg (via Beteiligungsholding 5000 GmbH): 3.055 percent
- BKS Bank: 3.055 percent
- Volksbank Group: 1,50 percent

UniCredit became by far the largest owner through its acquisition of Austrian operations that brought together Austrian banks that were originally separate shareholders of OeKB, such as Creditanstalt, Länderbank, and Schoellerbank.

== Supervision ==
OeKB is specifically exempted from application of the EU Capital Requirements Directives and is thus outside the scope of European Banking Supervision.

== See also ==
- List of banks in Austria
