= Euroclear Finland =

Financial market infrastructure

Euroclear Finland is the central securities depository (CSD) of Finland, headquartered in Helsinki. It is a fully owned subsidiary of the Euroclear Group.

== Overview ==
In June 1989, the Bank of Finland, the Finnish government and the Helibor banks established Helsingin Rahamarkkinakeskus Oy (HRMK, lit. 'Helsinki Money Market Centre Ltd') as the national CSD for government bonds, other bonds, and bank certificates of deposit. The central bank was HRMK's controlling shareholder. That same year, Osakekeskusrekisteri Osuuskunta (OKR, lit. 'Central Share Register Cooperative') was established as a CSD for shares listed on the Helsinki Stock Exchange. Both HRMK and OKR started operations in the spring of 1992. They were both replaced in 1995–1996 by Arvopaperikeskus Oy (APK, lit. 'Central Securities Depository Ltd'), a single system fostered by the Finnish government, which took over the operations of both HRMK and OKR. In December 1998, APK merged into the Helsinki Exchange, by then known as HEX.

On 22 April 2004, OM HEX AB, by then the owner of both the Finnish and Swedish stock exchanges, announced that APK would merge with its Swedish peer Värdepapperscentralen (VPC) to form the Nordic Central Securities Depository (NCSD). As a consequence of the transaction, OM HEX AB became owner of nearly 20 percent of NCSD, the rest being mainly owned by the four large Swedish banks that had controlled VPC. In subsequent years, the Swedish banks bought out the stake of OM HEX, which had been renamed OMX in August 2004.

On 2 June 2008, Euroclear announced its acquisition of the NCSD, after which the CSDs in Finland and Sweden were respectively renamed Euroclear Finland and Euroclear Sweden.

== See also ==
- European Central Securities Depositories Association
