= Clearstream Banking SA =

Financial market infrastructure

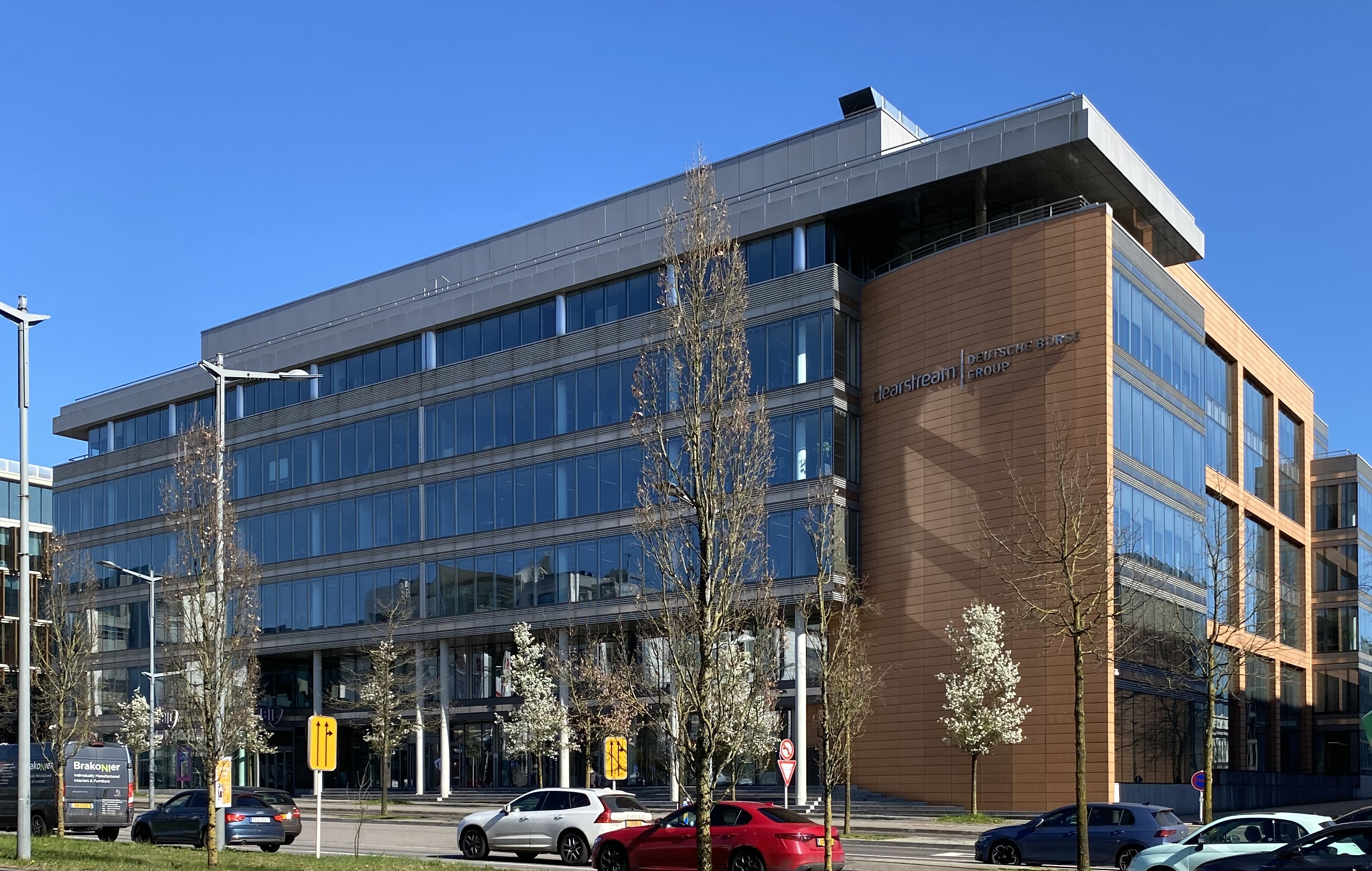
Building at 42, avenue J.-F. Kennedy in Luxembourg City, head office of Clearstream Banking SA

Clearstream Banking SA is one of two world-leading international central securities depositories, the other one being Euroclear Bank. It is a fully owned subsidiary of the Clearstream Group, itself part of Deutsche Börse Group.

== History ==
The Centrale de Livraison de Valeurs Mobilières (lit. 'central securities delivery [company]'), generally referred to as Cedel, was established on 28 September 1970, by 66 of the world's major financial institutions as a clearing organisation whose objective was to minimise risk in the settlement of cross-border securities trading, particularly in the growing Eurobond market. It was a direct response to the creation a few years earlier of the Euroclear System by American bank Morgan Guaranty in Brussels. At least initially, Euroclear was viewed as largely aligned with buy side interests whereas Cedel was closer to the sell side.

In 1995, a new corporate structure was introduced, establishing a parent company, Cedel International, while Cedel in Luxembourg was granted a banking license. In 1997, a new subsidiary, Cedel Global Services, was established.

On 2 November 1999, Cedel International signed an agreement with Deutsche Börse to merge Cedel with the latter's CSD arm, Deutsche Börse Clearing (DBC). This was initially intended as part of a three-way merger together with France's Sicovam, but the latter pulled out later that month. The merger was completed on 1 January 2000, and the name Clearstream was adopted nine days later by the new entity owned jointly by Cedel International (50 percent) and Deutsche Börse (50 percent). Following protracted discussions, Cedel International agreed on 1 February 2002 to sell its stake to Deutsche Börse. Clearstream thus became a fully owned subsidiary of Deutsche Börse on 1 July 2002.

== Controversy ==
=== Clearstream affair ===
The "Clearstream affair" was a political controversy in the run-up to the 2007 French presidential election.

=== Iranian funds controversy ===
In 2008, several groups of plaintiffs commenced enforcement proceedings in the US to satisfy judgments which they had obtained against Iran by restraining certain positions held in a Clearstream securities account with its intermediary bank in the US, and asking for handover of the assets. Clearstream challenged the restraints and the handover.

In 2011, the plaintiffs filed additional claims, this time directly against Clearstream, for damages of US$250 million in connection with the purported wrongful conveyance of some of the restrained positions. Clearstream entered into a settlement agreement with the plaintiffs that became effective in 2013. The settlement provided for the dismissal of the direct claims against Clearstream, and that the plaintiffs will not further sue Clearstream for damages and in return, Clearstream agreed to not further appeal an order directing the turnover of the restrained customer's assets to the plaintiffs.

In 2013, a number of US plaintiffs from the 2011 case, as well as other US plaintiffs, filed a complaint targeting certain blocked assets that Clearstream holds as a custodian in Luxembourg. In 2015, the US court issued a decision dismissing the lawsuit.

Arising from the above, the U.S. Treasury Department Office of Foreign Assets Control (OFAC) investigated certain securities' transfers in 2008 within Clearstream's settlement systems regarding US Iran sanctions regulations. These 2008 transfers had been undertaken as part of the decision taken by Clearstream in 2007 to close its Iranian customers' accounts. In 2013 Clearstream entered into settlement talks with OFAC. The matter was resolved in 2014 through a settlement and payment of US$151.9 million that does not constitute a final determination that a violation of Iran sanctions had occurred.

=== 2022: Aftermath of Russian invasion of Ukraine ===
The Russian depository blocked all securities held in Clearstream's account at the Russian depository, on 1 March 2022. The Russian depository also froze payments on securities of Russian issuers from being made to non-Russian individuals and entities.

After the 2022 Russian invasion of Ukraine, the Russian National Settlement Depository said on 25 March 2022 that Clearstream had blocked its account.

Also, the ruble bridge between Clearstream and Euroclear was closed. Furthermore, Clearstream stopped settling trades in Russian securities.

== See also ==
- European Central Securities Depositories Association
- List of banks in Luxembourg
