= Central securities depository =

Depository holding financial securities

A central securities depository (CSD) is a specialized financial market infrastructure organization holding securities such as shares or bonds, either in certificated or uncertificated (dematerialized) form, allowing ownership to be easily transferred through a book entry rather than by a transfer of physical certificates. This allows brokers and financial companies to hold their securities at one location where they can be available for clearing and settlement. In recent decades this has usually been finished electronically, making it much faster and easier than was traditionally the case where physical certificates had to be exchanged after a trade had been completed.

In some cases these organizations also carry out centralized comparison and transaction processing such as clearing and settlement of securities transfers, securities pledges, and securities freezes.

In modern corporate debt markets, investors achieve collateralization through CSDs. The CSDs operate as trustees for the owners of the security whereby the collateral is stored and automatically transferred to the lenders in case of non-performance.

== History ==
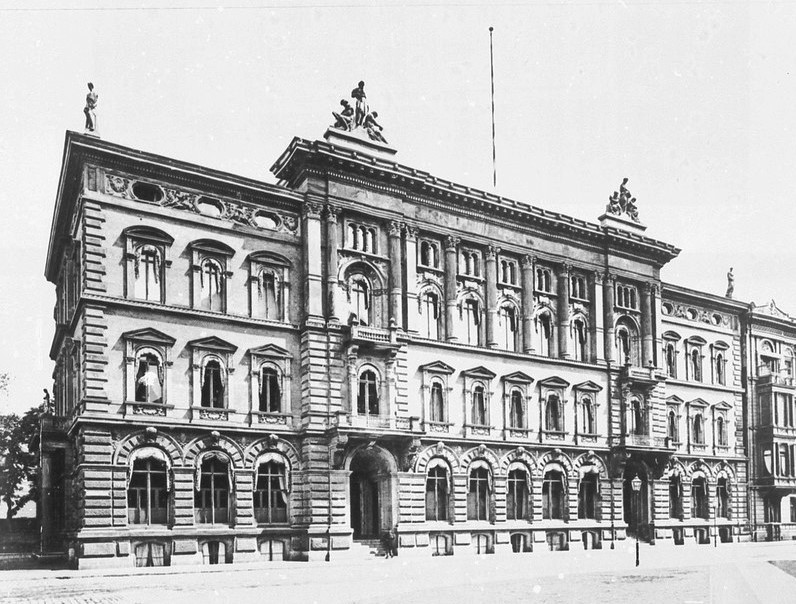
Building of the Berliner Kassenverein, ca. 1900

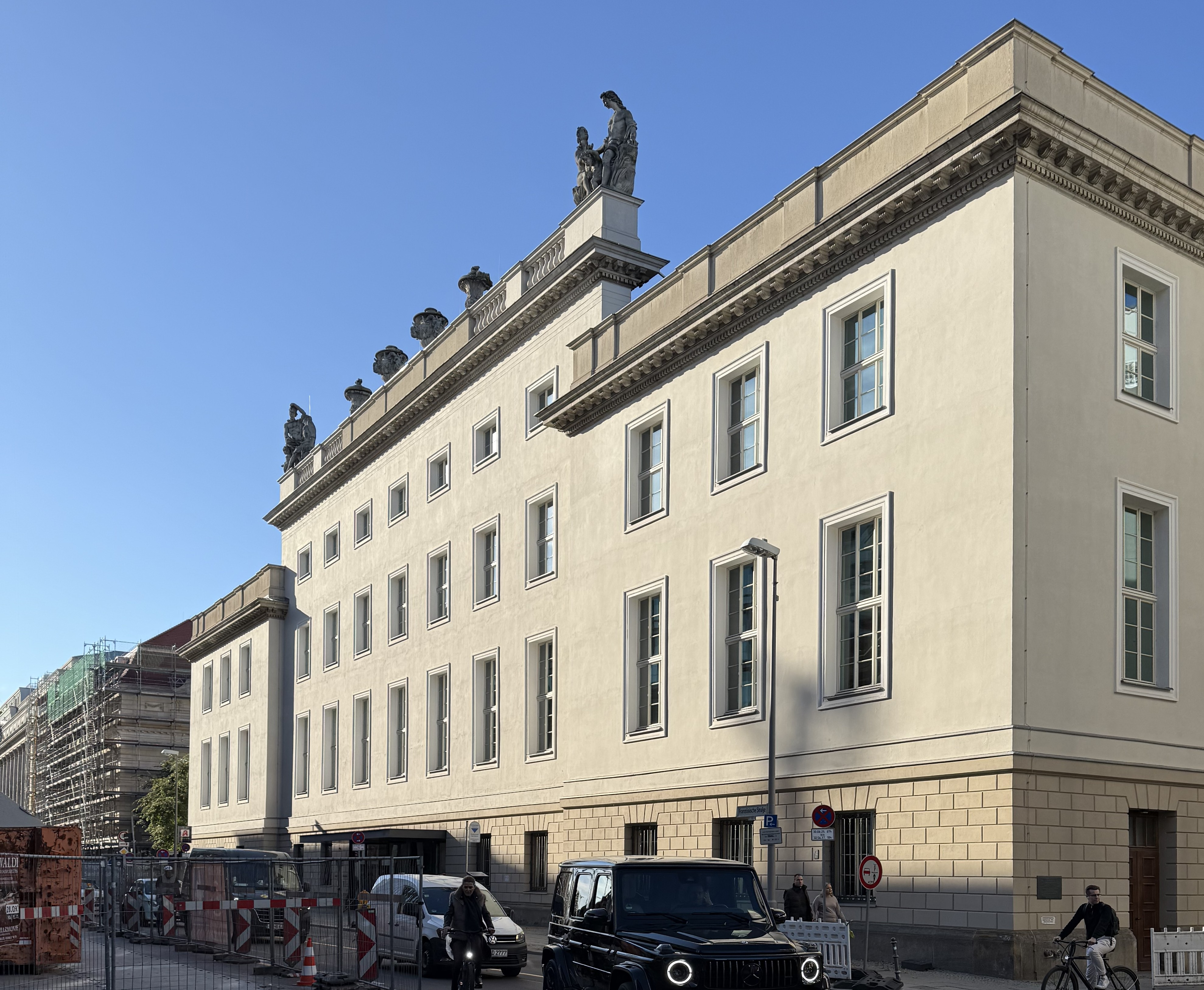
The same building after postwar reconstruction

The first recorded CSD was the Wiener Giro- und Cassen-Verein in Vienna, established in 1872. Also in 1872, the Berliner Kassenverein introduced a CSD-like service (German: Giro-Effekten-Depots), discontinued it two years later, and revived it on a permanent basis in 1882. Similarly named Kassenverein institutions subsequently spread in Germany, and under the German occupation of France, also to France in the early 1940s. The United States adopted the CSD model with the creation of the Depository Trust Company in 1973 following coordinated initiatives of the financial industry in the late 1960s. In the United Kingdom, the CREST project was only initiated in 1993, leading to the 1996 creation of CRESTCo as the country's first CSD.

The development of the eurobond market in the 1960s led to the first so-called international CSD or ICSD in the form of the Euroclear System initially developed by the Morgan Guaranty branch in Brussels, started in 1968 and reorganized in late 2000 as Euroclear Bank. In reaction, a group of other banks in 1970 founded a competing entity in nearby Luxembourg, initially called Cedel and rebranded in 2000 as Clearstream Banking SA. At least initially, Euroclear was viewed as largely aligned with buy side interests whereas Cedel was closer to the sell side.

== Scope ==
A CSD can be national or international in nature, and may be for a specific type of security, such as government bonds.

=== Domestic central securities depository ===
Many countries have one domestic CSD that was traditionally associated with the national stock exchange. These organizations are typically heavily regulated by the government and may or may not be separate from the exchanges where trading in securities occurs.

=== International central securities depository (ICSD) ===
An international CSD is a central securities depository that settles trades in international securities such as eurobonds although many also settle trades in various domestic securities, usually through direct or indirect (through local agents) links to local CSDs. Examples of international CSDs include Clearstream Banking SA (previously Cedel), Euroclear Bank, and SIX SIS. While viewed as a national CSD rather than an ICSD, the US Depository Trust Company (DTC) does hold over $2 trillion in non-US securities and in American depositary receipts from over 100 nations.

== Functions ==
- Safekeeping Securities may be in dematerialized form, book-entry only form (with one or more "global" certificates), or in physical form immobilized within the CSD.
- Deposit and withdrawal Supporting deposits and withdrawals involves the relationship between the transfer agent and/or issuers and the CSD. It also covers the CSD's role within the underwriting process or listing of new issues in a market.
- Dividend, interest, and principal processing, as well as corporate actions including proxy voting Paying and transfer agents, as well as issuers are involved in these processes, depending on the level of services provided by the CSD and its relationship with these entities.
- Other services CSDs offer additional services aside from those considered core services. These services include securities lending and borrowing, matching, and repo settlement, or ISIN assistance.
- Pledge - Central depositories provide pledging of share and securities. Every country is required to provide legal framework to protect the interest of the pledger and pledgee.

However, there are risks and responsibilities regarding these services that must be taken into consideration in analyzing and evaluating each market on a case-by-case basis.

== Regional and global bodies ==
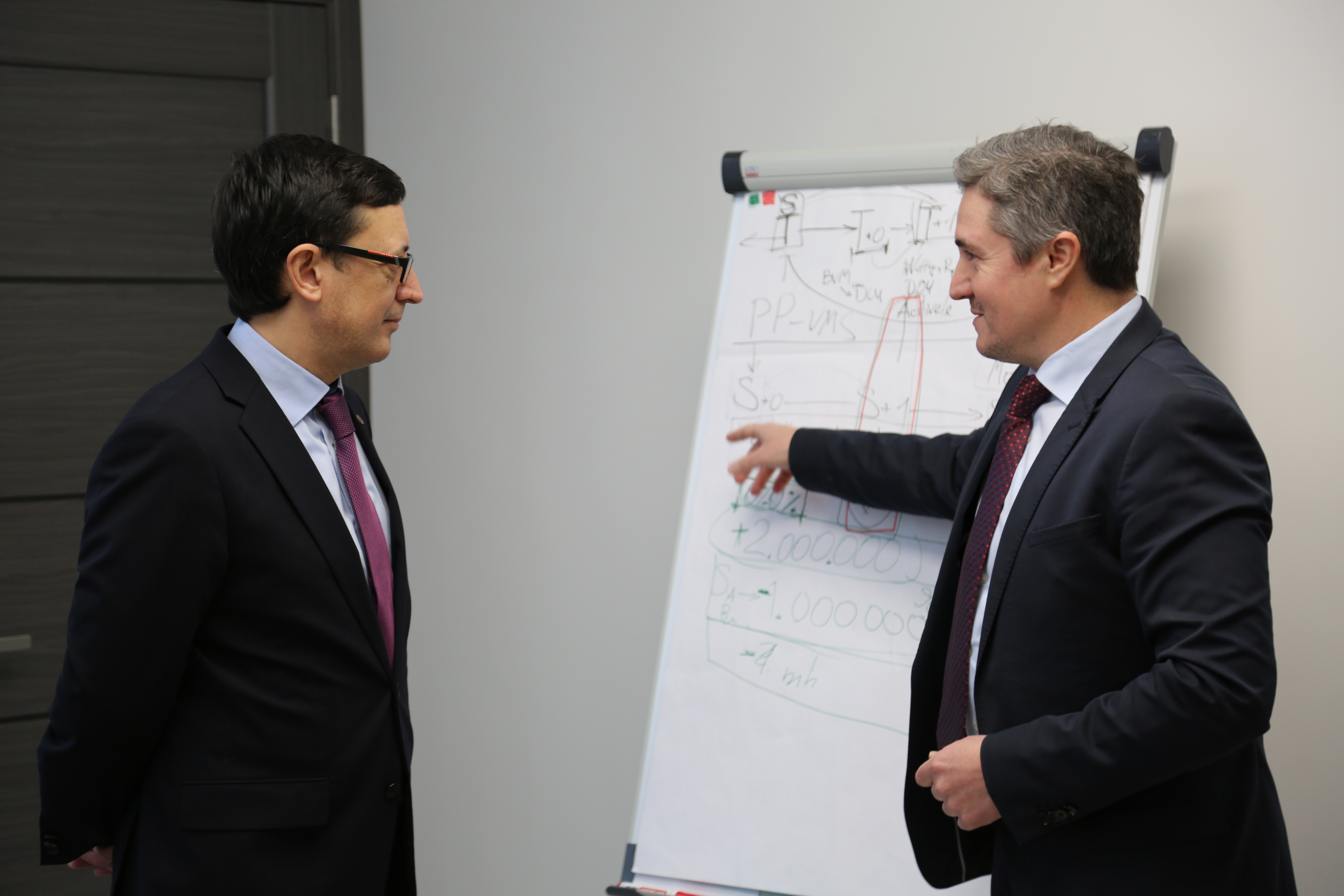
Alexandru Savva, director of the Moldovan Central Securities Depository, speaking to NBM gorvenor Octavian Armașu, 2018

CSDs have formed five regional associative bodies with partly overlapping membership: for example, the Central Securities Depository of Turkey (Turkish: Merkezi Kayıt Kuruluşu, MKK) is an associate member of ECSDA and a full member of ACG, AECSD and AMEDA. The five associations, in turn, have formed a global body, the World Forum of Central Securities Depositories.

=== European Central Securities Depositories Association ===
The European Central Securities Depositories Association (ECSDA), based in Brussels, was established in November 1997 by 13 founding members. As of early 2025, ECSDA had 32 full members and 8 associate members.

- (Austria) OeKB CSD
- (Belgium) Euroclear Bank
- Euroclear Belgium
- (Bulgaria) Central Depository AD (CDAD)
- (Croatia) SKDD
- Cyprus Stock Exchange (CSE)
- (Czech Republic) CSD Prague (CDCP)
- (Denmark) Euronext Securities Copenhagen
- Euroclear Finland
- Euroclear France
- (Germany) Clearstream Banking AG
- (Greece) ATHEXCSD
- (Hungary) KELER
- (Iceland) Verðbréfamiðstöð Íslands (VBM)
- (Italy) Euronext Securities Milan
- (Latvia) (Estonia) (Lithuania) Nasdaq CSD
- (Luxembourg) Clearstream Banking SA
- (Luxembourg) LuxCSD
- Malta Stock Exchange (MSE)
- (Moldova) Single Central Securities Depository (DCU)
- CSD & CC Montenegro
- (Netherlands) Euroclear Nederland
- (Norway) Euronext Securities Oslo
- (Poland) KDPW
- (Portugal) Euronext Securities Porto
- (Romania) Depozitarul Central
- (Slovakia) CDCP SR
- (Slovenia) KDD Central Securities Clearing Corporation
- (Spain) Iberclear
- Euroclear Sweden
- (Switzerland) SIX SIS
- (United Kingdom) Euroclear UK & International

Associate members as of early 2025 were the Registry of Securities (RVP) and Central Registry of Securities JSC Banja Luka (CR HoV RS) in Bosnia and Herzegovina; AIX CSD and KCSD in Kazakhstan; Central Securities Depository AD Skopje in North Macedonia; National Depository of Ukraine (NDU); Central Securities Depository and Clearing House (CR HoV) in Serbia; and the Central Securities Depository of Turkey (MKK).

=== Asia-Pacific Central Securities Depository Group ===
The Asia-Pacific Central Securities Depository Group, or Asia-Pacific CSD Group (ACG), was also formed in November 1997. As of early 2025, its membership was as follows.

- (Australia) Australian Securities Exchange (ASX)
- Bursa Malaysia Depository (Bursa Depository)
- Bursa Malaysia Securities Clearing (BMSC)
- Central Depository Bangladesh Limited (CDBL)
- China Central Depository & Clearing (CCDC)
- China Securities Depository and Clearing Corporation (CSDC)
- (India) Central Depository Services Limited (CDSL)
- Central Securities Depository of Iran (CSDI)
- (Kazakhstan) Kazakh Central Securities Depository (KCSD)
- (Nepal) CDS and Clearing Limited (CDSC)
- Central Depository Company of Pakistan (CDC Pakistan)
- Central Depository System of Sri Lanka (CDS)
- (Turkey) Central Securities Depository of Türkiye (MKK)
- Hong Kong Monetary Authority (HKMA)
- Hong Kong Securities Clearing Company (HKSCC)
- (India) Indian Clearing Corporation Limited (ICCL)
- Indonesia Clearing and Guarantee Corporation (KPEI)
- Japan Securities Depository Centre (JASDEC)
- Korea Securities Depository (KSD)
- (India) Multi Commodity Exchange Clearing Corporation Limited (MCXCCL)
- Maldives Securities Depository
- (Mongolia) Mongolian Central Securities Depository (MCSD)
- (Mongolia) Mongolian Securities Clearing Center (MSCC)
- (India) NSE Clearing Limited
- (India) National Securities Depository Limited (NSDL)
- New Zealand Central Securities Depository (NZCSD)
- National Clearing Company of Pakistan Limited (NCCPL)
- Kustodian Sentral Efek Indonesia (KSEI)
- (Philippines) Philippine Depository & Trust Corporation (PDTC)
- Royal Securities Exchange of Bhutan (RSEB)
- (China) Shanghai Clearing House (SHCH)
- Singapore Exchange (SGX)
- Taiwan Depository and Clearing Corporation (TDCC)
- Thailand Securities Depository (TSD)
- Uzbekistan State Central Securities Depository
- Vietnam Securities Depository and Clearing Corporation (VSDC)

In addition, the ACG had five associate members: the Association of Global Custodians, Calastone, the Singapore branch of Deutsche Bank, HSBC Hong Kong, and SIX SIS Singapore.

=== Americas Central Securities Depositories Association ===
The Americas Central Securities Depositories Association (ACSDA, Spanish: Asociación de Depósitos Centrales de Valores de América) was formed in 1999, with headquarters in Lima. As of early 2025, its membership was as follows.

- (Argentina) Caja de Valores
- (Argentina) Bolsas y Mercados Argentinos (BYMA)
- (The Bahamas) Bahamas Central Securities Depository (BCSD)
- Barbados Central Securities Depository (BCSD)
- Bermuda Stock Exchange (BSX)
- Entidad de Depósito de Valores de Bolivia (EDV)
- (Brazil) Brasil, Bolsa, Balcão (B3)
- (Canada) Canadian Depository for Securities (TMX CDS)
- (Chile) Depósito Central de Valores (DCV)
- Depósito Centralizado de Valores de Colombia (Deceval)
- (Costa Rica) InterClear Central de Valores
- Central Bank of Costa Rica
- (Dominican Republic) Central de Valores Dominicana (CEVALDOM)
- (Anguilla) (Antigua and Barbuda) (Dominica) (Grenada) (Montserrat) (Saint Kitts and Nevis) (Saint Lucia) (Saint Vincent and the Grenadines) Eastern Caribbean Central Securities Depository (ECCSD)
- (Ecuador) Depósito Centralizado de Compensación y Liquidación de Valores (Decevale)
- (El Salvador) Central de Depósito de Valores (Cedeval)
- (Guatemala) Central de Valores Nacional (CVN)
- Bank of Jamaica
- Jamaica Central Securities Depository (JCSD)
- (Mexico) Indeval
- (Nicaragua) Central Nicaragüense de Valores (Cenival)
- (Panama) Central Latinoamericana de Valores (Latinclear)
- (Paraguay) Bolsa de Valores de Asunción (BVA)
- (Peru) CAVALI
- Trinidad and Tobago Central Depository
- (United States) Depository Trust & Clearing Corporation
- Central Bank of Uruguay
- (Uruguay) Bolsa de Valores de Montevideo
- (Venezuela) Caja Venezolana de Valores (CVV)

=== Association of Eurasian Central Securities Depositories ===
The Association of Eurasian Central Securities Depositories (AECSD) brings together a number of central securities depositories (CSDs) in 9 countries of the former Soviet Union as well as India, Indonesia, Iran, Mongolia, South Korea, and Turkey. It was formed in Moscow in 2004, following a series of gathering of its would-be members in the previous three years. As of early 2025, a majority of its members (9 of 16) were simultaneously members of the ACG:

- National Depository Center of the Republic of Azerbaijan
- Central Depository of Armenia (CDA)
- Central Securities Depository of the Republic of Belarus
- (Georgia (country)) Georgian Central Securities Depository (GCSD)
- National Securities Depository Limited of India (NSDL)
- Central Depository Services Limited of India (CDSL)
- (Kazakhstan) Kazakh Central Securities Depository (KCSD)
- Central Depository of Kyrgyzstan
- National Settlement Depository of Russia (NSD)
- (Turkey) Central Securities Depository of Türkiye (MKK)
- Central Depository of Tajikistan
- Central Securities Depository of Uzbekistan
- Kustodian Sentral Efek Indonesia (KSEI)
- Central Securities Depository of Iran (CSDI)
- (Mongolia) Mongolian Central Securities Depository (MCSD)
- Korea Securities Depository (KSD)

=== Africa & Middle East Depositories Association ===
The Africa & Middle East Depositories Association (AMEDA) was established in April 2005. As of early 2025, its membership was as follows.

- (United Arab Emirates) Abu Dhabi Securities Market
- (Algeria) Algérie Clearing
- Bahrain Clear Company
- Central Securities Depository of Botswana
- (Ivory Coast) (Benin) (Burkina Faso) (Guinea-Bissau) (Ivory Coast) (Mali) (Niger) (Senegal) (Togo) Dépositaire Central/Banque de Règlement of the West African Economic and Monetary Union (DC/BR)
- (United Arab Emirates) Dubai Central Securities Depository
- (Egypt) Misr for Central Clearing, Depository & Registry (MCDR)
- (Egypt) Egyptian Central Securities Depository (ECSD)
- Central Securities Depository (Ghana) Limited
- (Iraq) Iraqi Depository Center
- (Jordan) Securities Depository Center
- Central Depository & Settlement Corporation (CDSC Kenya)
- Kuwait Clearing Company
- (Lebanon) Midclear
- (Libya) Libyan Stock Market
- Central Depository & Settlement Co. Ltd. (CDS Mauritius)
- (Morocco) Maroclear
- Nigeria Central Securities Clearing System (CSCS)
- (Nigeria) FMDQ Depository Limited
- (Oman) Muscat Clearing & Depository (SAOC)
- Palestine Exchange (PEX)
- (Qatar) Edaa
- National Bank of Rwanda
- (Saudi Arabia) Edaa
- (South Africa) Strate CSD
- (Sudan) Khartoum Stock Exchange
- (Syria) Damascus Securities Exchange
- (Tanzania) CSD & Registry Company Limited
- (Tunisia) Tunisie Clearing
- (Turkey) Central Securities Depository of Türkiye (MKK)
- (Zambia) Lusaka Securities Exchange
- (Zimbabwe) Chengetedzai Depository Company
- Zimbabwe Stock Exchange

=== World Forum of CSDs ===
The World Forum of Central Securities Depositories, or World Forum of CSDs, brings together the ECSDA, ACG, ACSDA, AECSD, and AMEDA.

== See also ==
- Clearing house
- Custodian bank
- Securities market participants (United States)
