= Euroclear Bank =

Financial market infrastructure

Euroclear Belgium
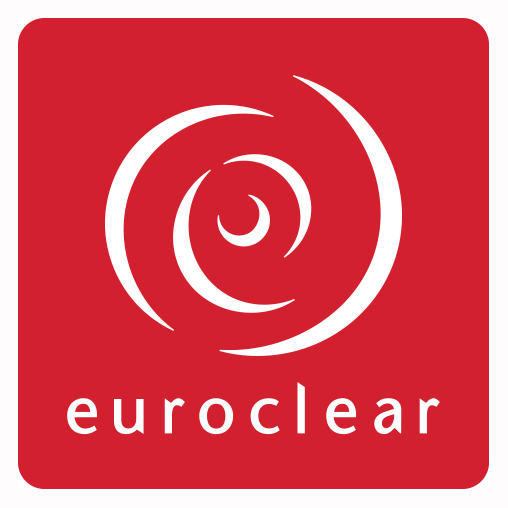

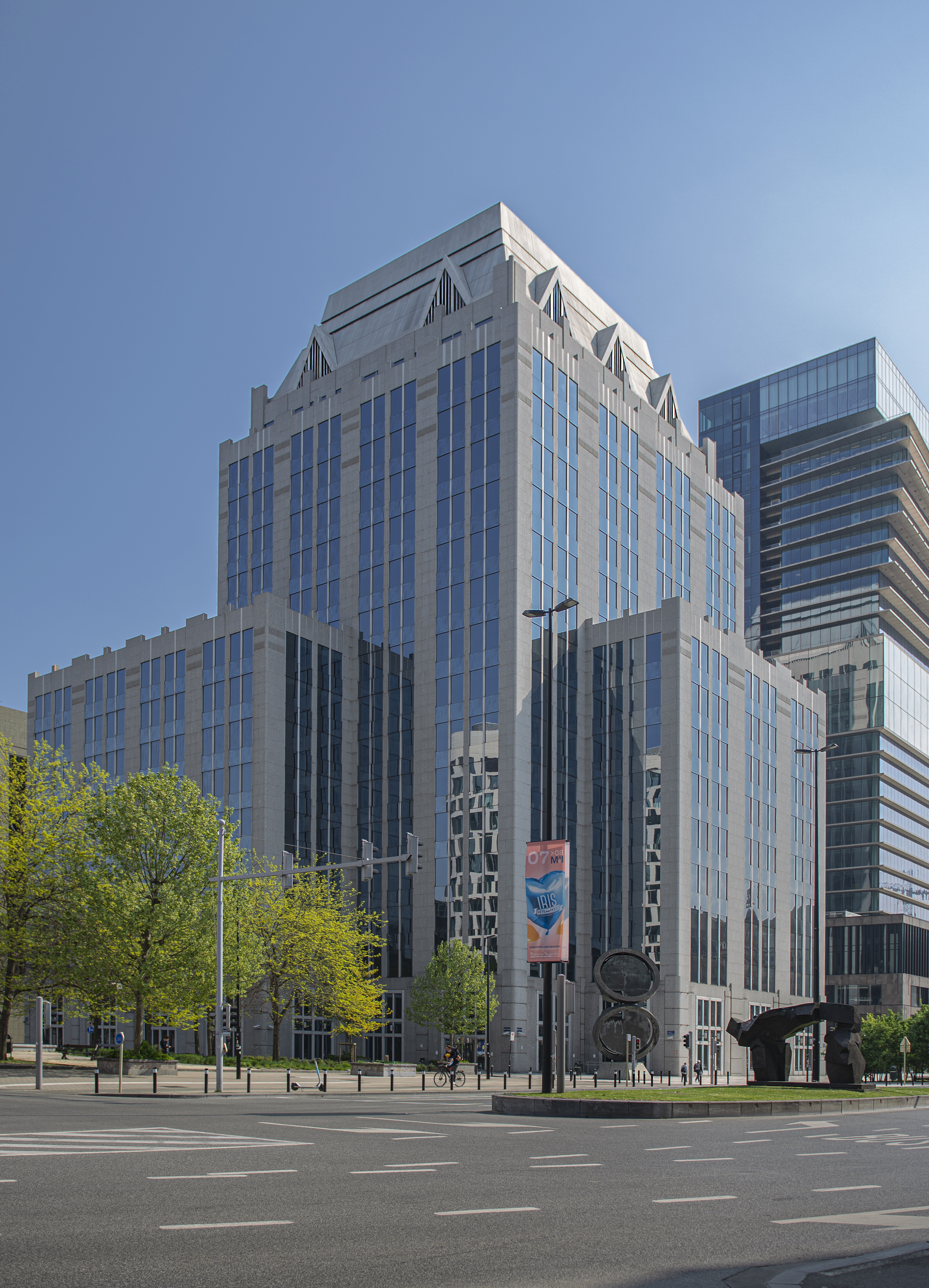
- Head office of Euroclear Bank and of the Euroclear Group in Brussels
- Company type: Subsidiary
- Industry: Finance
- Founded: 2000; 26 years ago
- Headquarters: Brussels, Belgium
- Products: Central securities depository
- Website: www.euroclear.com

Euroclear Bank is the international central securities depository (ICSD) of the Euroclear Group, based in Brussels, Belgium. It is one of the world's two main ICSDs, the other one being Clearstream Banking SA in Luxembourg.

As of 2018, it was the third-largest CSD by value of securities held, behind only Fedwire Securities Service and the Depository Trust Company, and the world's leading CSD by value of delivery instructions.

== History ==
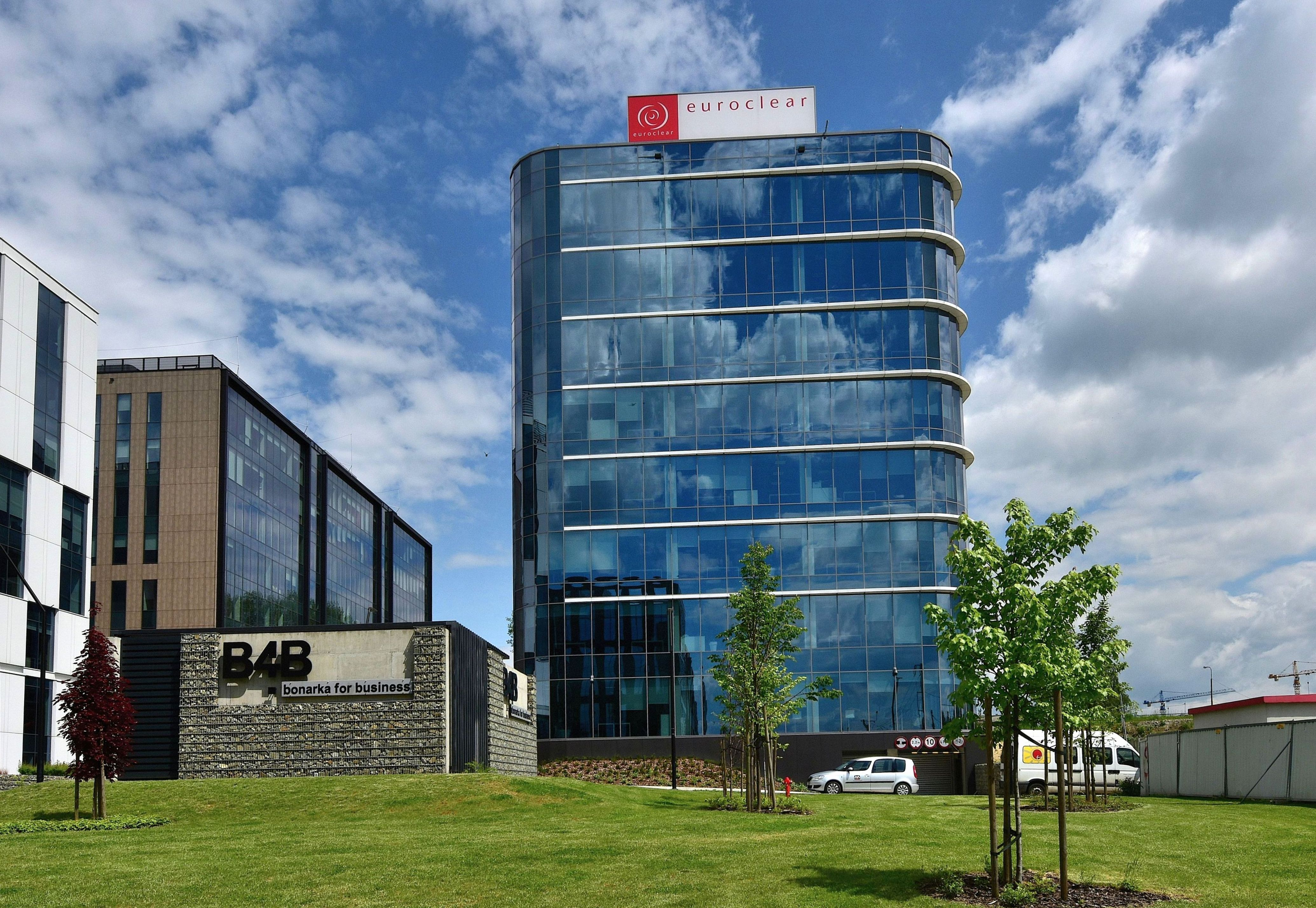
Euroclear Bank building in Kraków, Poland

On 31 December 2000, Euroclear Bank took over the operation of the Euroclear System from Morgan Guaranty, which had initiated it in 1967-1968.

As of 2023, Euroclear Bank maintained branches in Hong Kong, Kraków, and Tokyo as well as representative offices in Beijing, Dubai, Frankfurt, New York, and Singapore.

== Supervision ==
As a licensed bank, Euroclear Bank is subject to European Banking Supervision and supervised as such by the National Bank of Belgium (NBB) under the oversight of the European Central Bank (ECB), having been designated by the latter as a so-called Less Significant Institution. As a CSD, Euroclear Bank is licensed and supervised by the NBB and, albeit to a lesser extent, by Belgium's Financial Services and Markets Authority. In addition, a Multilateral Oversight Group (MOG) has been formed as a cooperation arrangement related to the oversight of Euroclear Bank, which includes the Federal Reserve Board of Governors, the Federal Reserve Bank of New York, Bank of England, Bank of Japan, Reserve Bank of Australia, plus the ECB as observer.

== Involvement in international sanctions during the Russo-Ukrainian War ==
In October 2012, Euroclear granted access to Russia’s National Settlement Depository, making it easier for other countries hooked to Euroclear's system to trade with Russia, and making Russia’s capital market integrated into London's and New York's markets. 3 years later, Russia mimicked the Euroclear System to create an exchange system with China.

In an article in Foreign Affairs and in a subsequent interview, economist Benn Steil, a senior fellow and director of international economics at Council on Foreign Relations (CFR), and CFR analyst Benjamin Della Rocca argued that Russia may have - in transactions executed through the Central Bank of China and then likely through Chinese state-owned banks as intermediaries - deposited $80 billion in U.S. Treasury bonds at Euroclear in the buildup to the 2022 Russian invasion of Ukraine.

The Russian depository blocked and froze all securities held in Euroclear's account at the Russian depository, on March 1, 2022. The Russian depository also froze payments on securities of Russian issuers from being made to foreign individuals and entities.

On March 18, 2022, Euroclear restricted operations on the account of the Russian National Settlement Depository; it stopped executing any instructions to carry out transactions with securities and money, including instructions to participate in corporate actions on foreign securities.

Euroclear also disabled its ruble accounts with ING Bank in Russia and Russia's VTB Bank, the result of which was that its clients are no longer allowed to transfer any rubles, and the ruble bridge between Clearstream and Euroclear was closed. Furthermore, Euroclear limited settling trades in Russian securities.

== Involvement in sovereign credit events ==
=== Argentina ===
On 25 March 2015, New York federal judge Thomas Griesa ordered Euroclear to stop processing payments of Argentina's debt bonds. This court injunction follows Argentina's decade-long dispute with its creditors. The next day, the trading bridge between Euroclear and Clearstream on those Argentine bonds were also shuttered until further notice. The intent of this injunction was to force Argentina to fully pay their creditors in order to gain back access to its bond-selling program.

=== Greece ===
In April 2012, Euroclear participated in the restructuring of the Greek debt by swapping 41 billion euros of Greek bonds, which represented about a third of the foreigner-held Greek debt.

=== Russia ===
In June 2022, Euroclear participated in blocking Russian funds.

== See also ==
- European Central Securities Depositories Association
- List of banks in Belgium
