= Valoren number =

Swiss securities identification code

The valoren number is a code which identifies listed securities and financial instruments in Switzerland, and serves a similar purpose to CUSIP or WKN in the North American or German markets respectively. The valoren number is incorporated in the Swiss ISIN number.

== Allocation methodology ==
The valoren number is a numeric code that intrinsically has no meaning. When a new number is needed, the next one from the list is simply allocated. An instrument's number indicates nothing about the instrument itself.

== Uses ==
The valoren number can be used for a number of purposes in identifying a financial instrument:

- Globally a valoren number is allocated for any type of financial instrument which meets the allocation rules. It can be used in conjunction with the Market Identifier Code (MIC) and the currency code to identify a traded instrument. It can be used in transaction reporting and for position keeping.
- In Switzerland and Liechtenstein the valoren number is the main identifier in the Swiss Value Chain and is used as the main identifier by financial institutions throughout the region and beyond.
- Valoren numbers for derivatives may be reused after the derivative expires.

== Etymology ==
The word Valor is a Swiss German banking term for a "security", including coins and paper money. In Switzerland, when referring to the code, it is always referred to as the Valorennummer, i.e. security number. The plural of Valor in Swiss German is Valoren.

In the English speaking world, the words "valor" and "valoren" are sometimes used interchangeably.

== Issuing authority ==
The valoren number is issued by SIX Financial Information.

== See also ==
- International Securities Identifying Number (ISIN, defined in ISO 6166)
- ISO 10383
- ISO 10962
- NSIN
- Ticker symbol
- Option symbol
- SEDOL
