= National Securities Identifying Number =

Code identifying a financial instrument

A National Securities Identifying Number, or NSIN, is a generic nine-character alphanumeric code which identifies a fungible security. The NSIN is issued by a national numbering agency (NNA) designated for that country. Regional substitute NNAs have been allocated the task of functioning as NNAs in those countries where NNAs have not yet been established. NSINs are used as part of the makeup of a product's ISIN.

== Sample NNA and NSIN designations ==
- In the United States and Canada the NNA is the CUSIP Services Bureau and the NSIN is the CUSIP.
- In the United Kingdom, the NNA is the London Stock Exchange and the NSIN is the SEDOL.
- In France, the NNA is Euroclear France and the NSIN used to be the Sicovam code. As of July 1, 2003 SICOVAMs are no longer issued, ISINs being used instead.
- In Germany, the NNA is Wertpapier-Mitteilungen and the NSIN is the WKN.
- In Italy, the NNA is the Bank of Italy after the incorporation of the Ufficio Italiano Cambi (Italian Exchange Bureau).
- In Switzerland, the NNA is SIX Financial Information and the NSIN is the Valor Number

== See also ==
- CUSIP
- ISO 6166
- ISO 10383
- ISO 10962
- International Securities Identifying Number
- National numbering agency
