= National numbering agency =

Organisation that issues ISINs

A national numbering agency (NNA) is the organisation in each country responsible for issuing International Securities Identification Numbers (ISIN) as described by the ISO 6166 standard and the Classification of Financial Instruments code as described by the ISO 10962 standard. The role of NNA is typically assigned to the national stock exchange, central bank, or financial regulator but may be as diverse as a financial data provider or clearing and custodian organisation for that country.

There is a global governing body that coordinates the work of the NNAs called the Association of National Numbering Agencies (ANNA).

== By country ==
Country	NNA
Abu Dhabi	WM Datenservice
Afghanistan	WM Datenservice
Albania	WM Datenservice
Algeria	Algerie Clearing
Andorra	WM Datenservice
Argentina	Caja de Valores S.A.
Armenia	Central Depository of Armenia OJSC
Australia	Australian Stock Exchange Limited
Austria	Oesterreichische Kontrollbank AG
Azerbaijan	National Depository Center
Bahrain	Bahrain Stock Exchange
Bangladesh	Central Depository Bangladesh Ltd.
Barbados	CUSIP Global Services
Belarus	The Republican Unitary Enterprise "The Republican Central Securities Depository"
Belgium	SIX Financial Information
Benin	WM Datenservice
Bhutan	WM Datenservice
Bolivia	Entitad de Deposito de Valores de Bolivia S.A.
Botswana	Botswana Stock Exchange
Brazil	BM&F Bovespa - Bolsa de Valores, Mercadorias & Futuros de São Paulo - BVSP
Brunei	WM Datenservice
Bulgaria	Central Depository of Bulgaria
Burkina Faso	WM Datenservice
Burundi	WM Datenservice
Canada	The Canadian Depository for Securities Ltd
Cape Verde	Bolsa de Valores de Cabo Verde
Cayman Islands	CUSIP Global Services
Chile	Deposito Central de Valores
China	China Securities Regulatory Commission
Colombia	Deposito Centralizado de Valores de Colombia - DECEVAL S.A.
Cook Inslands	SIX Financial Information
Costa Rica	Central de Valores - CEVAL
Croatia	Central Depository and Clearing Company Inc. of Croatia
Cyprus	Cyprus Stock Exchange
Czech Republic	Czech National Bank
Denmark	VP Securities Services
Dominican Republic	CEVALDOM
Ecuador	DECEVALE S.A.
Egypt	Misr for Central Clearing, Depository and Registry (MCDR)
El Salvador	Central Deposito de Valores S.A. de C.V.
Equatorial Guinea	WM Datenservice
Eritrea	WM Datenservice
Estonia	WM Datenservice
Eswatini	WM Datenservice
Ethiopia	WM Datenservice
European Union	WM Datenservice
Finland	Euroclear Finland
France	Euroclear France
French Guiana	WM Datenservice
French Polynesia	WM Datenservice
Gabon	WM Datenservice
Georgia	National Bank of Georgia
Germany	WM Datenservice
Ghana	Ghana Stock Exchange
Gibraltar	WM Datenservice
Greece	Hellenic Exchanges S.A.
Grenada	CUSIP Global Services
Guatemala	Bolsa de Valores Nacional, S.A.
Honduras	Comision Nacional de Bancos y Seguros
Hongkong	Hong Kong Exchanges and Clearing Ltd
Hungary	KELER – Central Clearing House and Depository (Budapest) Ltd.
Iceland	NASDAQ OMX/Icelandic Securities Depository
India	Securities and Exchange Board of India
Indonesia	PT Kustodian Sentral Efek Indonesia (Indonesian Central Securities Depository – ICSD)
Iran	Tehran Securities Exchange Technology Management Company
Ireland	Irish Stock Exchange
Israel	Tel Aviv Stock Exchange
Italy	Banca d'Italia
Japan	Tokyo Stock Exchange
Jordan	Securities Depository Center (Jordan)
Kazakhstan	ISC -Central Securities Depository
Kenya	Nairobi Stock Exchange
Korea, South	Korea Exchange - KRX
Kuwait	Kuwait Clearing Company
Latvia	OMX - Latvian Central Depository
Lebanon	Midclear S.A.L.
Libya	Libyan Stock Market
Lithuania	Central Securities Depository of Lithuania
Luxembourg	Clearstream Banking
Malaysia	Bursa Malaysia
Malta	Malta Stock Exchange
Mauritius	Central Depository & Settlement Co. Ltd
Mexico	S.D. Indeval SA de CV
Montenegro	Central Depository Agency of Montenegro
Mongolia	Mongolian Securities Clearing House and Central Depository
Morocco	MAROCLEAR S.A.
Netherlands	Euroclear Nederland
Nepal	CDS and Clearing Ltd., Kathmandu, Nepal
New Zealand	No single numbering agency; two are active New Zealand Stock Exchange and Reserve Bank of New Zealand
Nicaragua	Central Nicaragüense de Valores, Cenival
Nigeria	Central Securities Clearing System Ltd.
North Macedonia	Central Securities Depository AD Skopje
Norway	Verdipapirsentralen (VPS) ASA
Oman	Muscat Depository & Securities Registration Co.
Pakistan	Central Depository Company of Pakistan Ltd
Panama	Bolsa de Valores de Panama S.A.
Paraguay	Bolsa de Valores y Productos Asunción
Peru	Bolsa de Valores de Lima
Philippines	Philippine Stock Exchange, Inc.
Poland	Krajowy Depozyt Papierów Wartościowych (Central Securities Depository of Poland)
Portugal	Interbolsa - Sociedade Gestora de Sistemas de Liquidação e Sistemas Centralizados de Valores
Romania	Depozitarul Central S.A. (Romanian Central Depository)
Russia	The National Depository Center (NDC)
Saudi Arabia	Saudi Financial Market (Tadawul)
Serbia	Central Securities Depository A.D. Beograd
Singapore	Singapore Exchange
Slovakia	Central Securities Depository SR, Inc.
Slovenia	KDD Central Securities Clearing Corporation
South Africa	JSE Ltd
Spain	Comisión Nacional del Mercado de Valores (CNMV)
Sri Lanka	Colombo Stock Exchange
Sweden	Euroclear Sweden
Switzerland	SIX Financial Information
Syria	Damascus Securities Exchange
Taiwan	Taiwan Stock Exchange Corporation
Tanzania	Dar es Salaam Stock Exchange
Thailand	Thailand Securities Depository Co., Ltd
Tunisia	Sticodevam
Turkey	Takasbank
Uganda	Uganda Securities Exchange
Ukraine	National Depository of Ukraine
United Kingdom	London Stock Exchange
United States	FactSet - CUSIP Global Services
Venezuela	Bolsa de Valores de Caracas, C.A.
Vietnam	Vietnam Securities Depository
Zambia	Lusaka Stock Exchange
Zimbabwe	Zimbabwe Stock Exchange
Economic Community of Central African States	Bourse des Valeurs Mobilieres de l´Afrique Centrale(BVMAC)
West African Economic and Monetary Union	Bourse Régionale des Valeurs Mobilières
International	Clearstream Banking
International	Euroclear Bank
