= ISIDPlus =

ISIDPlus (International Securities Identification Directory) is a comprehensive database of global security identifiers, cross-referencing more than one million issues. The database is co-produced by Standard & Poor's and SIX Financial Information.
