= Uniform Symbology =

Uniform Symbology (also known as UMTF), in the context of European financial markets, refers to a common scheme to refer to securities ("symbols"), adopted by European markets in 2008. The original announcement reads as follows:

In order to facilitate orderly and efficient trading of securities across multiple markets, the founders of the Committee on Uniform Symbology (BATS Europe, Chi-X Europe - now Cboe Europe - and NASDAQ OMX Europe) agreed to create and adopt a common securities symbology to uniformly identify securities traded across Europe. A committee was formed for the purpose of which was to create, maintain and modify as necessary the uniform methodology for securities symbology (Uniform Symbology) to be applied to the securities and to develop and use the Uniform Symbology in furtherance of the committee’s aims and objectives. Since the founding of the Committee on Uniform Symbology other members have joined including: Turquoise, NYSE Euronext and QUOTE MTF.

(See links to some of the market's press releases in the External links section below.)

== Symbology Algorithm ==
The Uniform Symbology Algorithm is designed to be human readable, fit into 6 characters, have no symbol clashes and where possible, be derivable from another, freely available code.

It will consist of a stock code followed by a single, lower case letter designating the primary listing exchange.

The stock code will be derived from the “local code” published by the primary exchange. These will be truncated where necessary.

If the local code contains a single letter class designator of A through Z (e.g. “STE A”) then the single letter class designator shall be retained and the code will be truncated to a maximum of 4 characters, plus the single letter class (A through Z) designator. For some Nordic stocks the share designator will be prefixed with “SDB” (e.g. “SDBA”). In this case the “SDB” should be removed and the single letter class (A through Z) designator will be retained.

Any codes containing spaces, periods, underscores or second words (other than the single letter class (A through Z) described above) will be truncated at the space, period, etc.

All remaining non-alphanumeric characters should be removed.

=== Stock Code Truncation Examples ===
Local Code	Truncated Local Code	Notes
VGAS SDB	VGAS	“ SDB” Removed.
NDA SEK	NDA	“ SEK” Removed.
MAERSK B	MAERB	“MAERSK” Truncated to “MAER”, “B” retained.
ASSA B	ASSAB	“ ” removed, “B” retained.
ATCO A	ATCOA	“ ” removed, “A” retained.
ATCO B	ATCOB	A/B share distinction retained.
BP.	BP	“.” Removed.
BT.A	BT	“.A” Truncated.
F&C	FC	“&” removed
Y&Z B	YZB	“&” removed, “ “ removed, “B” retained
TWW SDBB	TWWB	“ “ removed, “SDB” removed, “B” retained

=== Market codes by market centre (including examples) ===
Note that in some cases a market code suffix is shared by multiple listing markets. For example, the letter "y" is used for stocks listed on the Athens, Cyprus and Malta exchanges.

Market Centre	MIC	Market Code	Sample Local Code	Sample Uniform Symbology Code	Sample Company Name	RIC Suffix
Copenhagen Stock Exchange	XCSE	c	DANSK	DANSKc	Danske Bank Ord	CO
Deutsche Borse/Germany	XETR	d	EXS1	EXS1d	iShares DAX ETF	DE
Euronext Amsterdam	XAMS	a	HEIA	HEIAa	Heineken	AS
Euronext Brussels	XBRU	b	INB	INBb	INBEV	BR
Euronext Paris	XPAR	p	RNO	RNOp	Renault	PA
Euronext Lisbon/Portugal	XLIS	u	ALTR	ALTRu	ALTRI SGPS	LS
Bucharest Stock Exchange	XBSE	f	AMO	AMOf	Amonil SA	
Bulgaria Stock Exchange	XBUL	f	5BT	5BTf	Vivacom	
NASDAQ OMX Vilnius/Lithuania	XLIT	f	AGP1L	AGP1Lf	Alita Group AB	
NASDAQ OMX Riga/Latvia	XRIS	f	GRZ1R	GRZ1Rf	Grobina	
NASDAQ OMX Tallinn/Estonia	XTAL	f	PRF1T	PRF1Tf	Premia Foods AS	
Helsinki Stock Exchange	XHEL	h	NOK1V	NOK1Vh	Nokia	HE
Irish Stock Exchange	XDUB	i	GNC	GNCi	Greencore Group plc	I
Johannesburg Stock Exchange	XJSE	j	AGL	AGLj	Anglo American plc	J
Prague Stock Exchange	XPRA	k	BOREY	BOREY	Borealis Exploration	
London Stock Exchange	XLON	l	VOD	VODl	Vodafone Group Ord	L
Bolsa de Madrid	XMAD	e	COL	COLe	Inmobiliaria Colonial	MC
Borsa Italiana/Milan	XMIL	m	SPM	SPMm	Saipem	MI
USA Securities/New York		n	QQQQ	QQQQn	Powershares QQQ	
Oslo Stock Exchange	XOSL	o	NHY	NHYo	Norsk Hydro	OL
Aquis Stock Exchange/London	AQSE	q	ADB	ADBq	Adnams PLC	
Reykjavik, Iceland	XICE	r	OSSR	OSSRr	Ossur Ord	
Stockholm Stock Exchange	XSTO	s	VOLB	VOLBs	Volvo B Ord	ST
Budapest Stock Exchange	XBUD	t	OTP	OTPt	OTP Bank PLC	
Ljubljana Stock Exchange/Slovenia	XLJU	t	ABKN	ABKNt	Abanka Vipa DD	
Bratislava Stock Exchange/Slovakia	XBRA	t	1SEA01AE	1SEA0t	Semat AS	
Vienna Stock Exchange	XWBO	v	VIG	VIGv	Vienna Insurance Group	VI
Warsaw Stock Exchange	XWAR	w	TPE	TPEw	TAURON PE	WA
Cboe Europe	CHIX	x	IEEM	IEEMx	iShares MSCI Emerging Markets ETF	CHI
Luxembourg Stock Exchange	XLUX	x	BIP	BIPx	BIP Investment Partners	
Athens Stock Exchange	XATH	y	INTET	INTETy	Intertech SA	
Cyprus Stock Exchange	XCYS	y	SEAS	SEASy	Sea Star Capital	
Malta Stock Exchange	XMAL	y	HSB	HSBy	HSBC Bank Malta PLC	
Swiss Exchange/Zurich(blue chip)	XVTX	z	UBSN	UBSNz	UBS N Ord	VX
Swiss Exchange/Zurich(non-blue chip)	XSWX	z	ACIN	ACINz	Acino Holding AG	S
