= Euroclear Belgium =

Financial market infrastructure

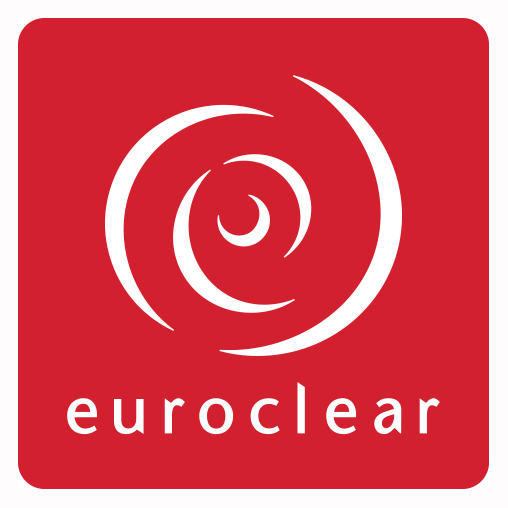

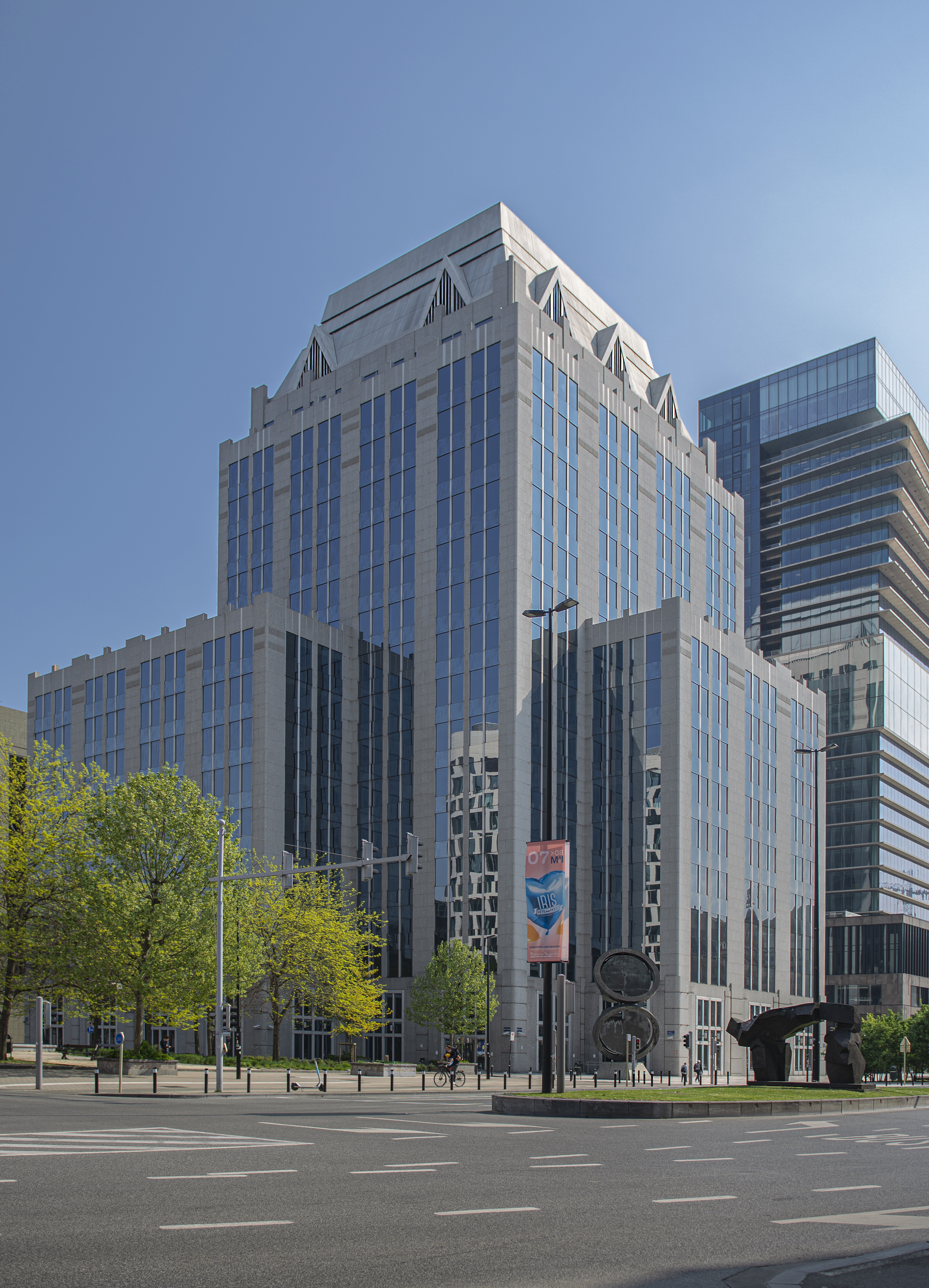
- Head office of Euroclear Belgium and of the Euroclear Group in Brussels
- Type: Subsidiary
- Industry: Finance
- Founded: 1967; 59 years ago
- Headquarters: Brussels, Belgium
- Products: Central securities depository
- Website: www.euroclear.com/services/en/provider-homepage/euroclear-belgium.html

Euroclear Belgium is one of three central securities depositories (CSDs) in Belgium, together with Euroclear Bank and NBB-SSS. It is the main CSD for Belgian securities other than government bonds. Both Euroclear Belgium and Euroclear Bank are fully owned entities of the Euroclear Group, which is like them is headquartered in Brussels.

== History ==
The Caisse Interprofessionnelle de Dépôts et de Virements de Titres / Interprofessionele Effectendeposito- en Girokas (lit. 'all-industries securities deposits and transfers institution'), abbreviated as CIK, was initiated in 1967, and formally created by Belgian Royal Decree of 1 April 1968. In 1999, CIK merged with the Brussels Stock Exchange and the Belgium Futures and Options Exchange (BELFOX, est. 1991) to form Brussels Exchanges, abbreviated as BXS.

In 2000, BXS merged with its Dutch and French counterparts to form Euronext. In December 2004, Euroclear announce it would acquire CIK from Euronext, following its takeovers of Sicovam (France) in 2001, and Necigef (Netherlands) and CRESTCo (UK) in 2002. The acquisition was only completed on 1 January 2006, following which CIK adopted Euroclear Belgium as its commercial name.

In January 2009, the Euroclear-owned CSDs in Belgium and the Netherlands migrated to a technical platform known as the Euroclear Settlement of Euronext-zone Securities (ESES), which had been launched in November 2007 in France. Since then, ESES has been operated by Euroclear as a single platform, even though the relevant contracts and legal arrangements remain differentiated for the three countries.

In 2016, Euroclear Belgium connected to TARGET2-Securities (T2S), the Eurosystem's securities settlement service. On that occasion, Euroclear France was appointed investor CSD within ESES. As part of that process, on 18 March 2016, all eligible foreign securities from Euroclear Nederland and Euroclear Belgium were transferred to Euroclear France as the CSD of reference. In September 2016, the connection of the three ESES CSDs was successfully completed.

== See also ==
- Euroclear France
- Euroclear Nederland
- European Central Securities Depositories Association
