= Cash cow =

Business jargon

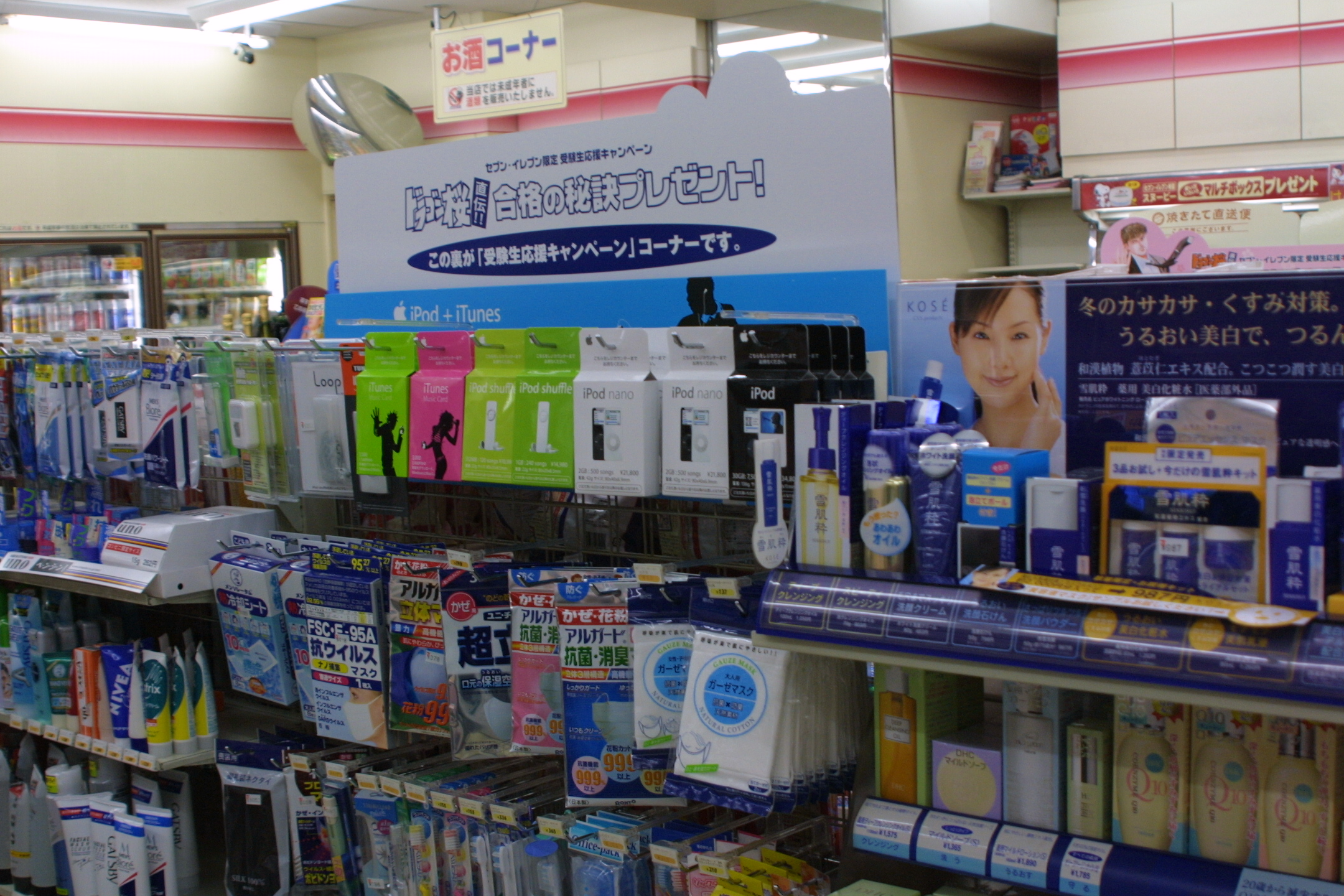
iPods for sale in a Japanese 7-Eleven. 48% of Apple's revenue for the first quarter of 2007 was from iPod sales, and it was considered a "cash cow"

A cash cow is a product or service that generates significant revenue over a long period of time for the company that sells it. They also generate more cash than they consume. Revenue “milked” from cash cows is often used to subsidise less profitable parts of a business.

The term cash cow is a metaphor for a dairy cow used on farms to produce milk, offering a steady stream of income with little maintenance.

Cash cows are products or services that have achieved market leader status, provide positive cash flows and a return on assets (ROA) that exceeds the market growth rate. The idea is that such products produce profits long after the initial investment has been recouped. By generating steady streams of income, cash cows help fund the overall growth of a company, their positive effects spilling over to other business units. Furthermore, companies can use them as leverage for future expansions, as lenders are more willing to lend money knowing that the debt will be serviced.

Cash cows can be also used to buy back shares already on the market or increase the dividends paid to shareholders. They usually bring in cash for years, until new technology or shifting market preferences renders them obsolete.

== Disadvantages ==
Cash cows can act as barriers to entry to the market for new products, as entrants need to invest heavily in order to achieve the brand awareness required to capture a significant share of the market away from the dominant players. A higher pay out rate of earning in the form of share repurchase or cash/share dividend might also increase the risk of future dividend cut and is an indication of lack of growth opportunity.

Since the business unit can maintain profits with little maintenance or investment, a cash cow can also be used to describe a profitable but complacent company or business unit.

In his book The Innovator's Dilemma, Clayton M. Christensen argues that listening to existing customers' concerns can prevent a highly successful business from innovating, resulting in smaller competitors eventually producing disruptive innovations. This sentiment is expressed in the business aphorism "If I had asked people what they wanted, they would have said faster horses", which is misattributed to Henry Ford, a pioneering manufacturer of the automobile.

== Example cash cows ==
Successful products that satisfy the criteria for cash cows include:

- Amazon Web Services generates revenue which is used to subsidise the less profitable business of online shopping at Amazon.
- Apple Inc.'s iPod line.
- Rockstar Games canceled unannounced video game projects due to Grand Theft Auto Online becoming a cash cow.
- Tertiary education often relies on international students as cash cows to subsidise research, management, administration and teaching of home students.
- Private Market Assets can serve as a cash cow for investors.

== See also ==
- Growth–share matrix
