= Euroclear =

Financial market infrastructure

Euroclear Holding SA/NV
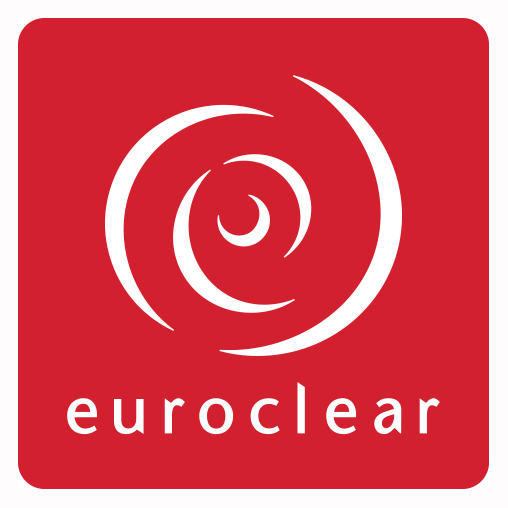

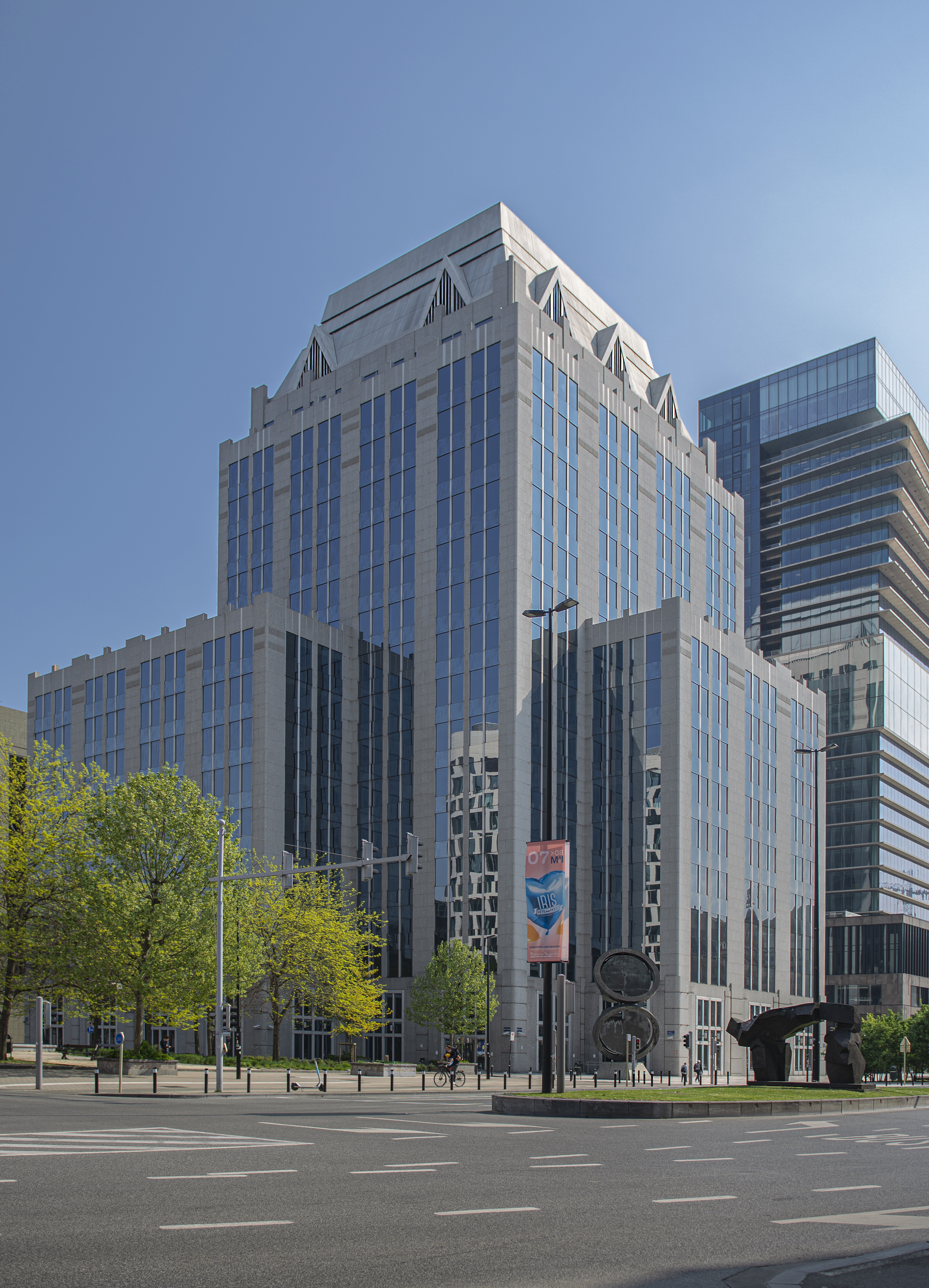
- Euroclear group head office in Brussels
- Industry: Finance
- Founded: 1968; 58 years ago
- Founder: Morgan Guaranty
- Headquarters: Brussels, Belgium
- Products: Central securities depository
- AUM: €45 trillion (2026)
- Members: 2,000+
- Number of employees: 6000 as of 2024
- Divisions: Euroclear Bank; Euroclear Belgium; Euroclear Finland; Euroclear France; Euroclear Nederland; Euroclear Sweden; Euroclear UK & International
- Website: www.euroclear.com

Euroclear, or the Euroclear Group, is a Belgium-based financial market infrastructure group that specialises in the central securities depository (CSD) segment. It traces its origins to the Euro-clear System developed in 1968 by Morgan Guaranty (a predecessor of JPMorgan Chase) in Brussels to settle trades on the then developing eurobond market. The service was rebranded Euroclear (without hyphen) in 1990.

In late 2000, the Euroclear System was transferred to a new entity, Euroclear Bank, a fully owned subsidiary of the Euroclear Group that has remained one of the world's two leading international CSDs, the other being Clearstream Banking SA in nearby Luxembourg. Other entities of the Euroclear group include major national CSDs acquired by Euroclear in the 2000s in Belgium, Finland, France, the Netherlands, Sweden, and the UK.

The name "Euroclear" is often misinterpreted as indicating a clearing activity of the Euroclear group, which is actually not the case. This confusion comes from the name originating before the widespread adoption of central counterparty clearing, in a time when securities clearing and settlement were often viewed as a single activity.

== History ==
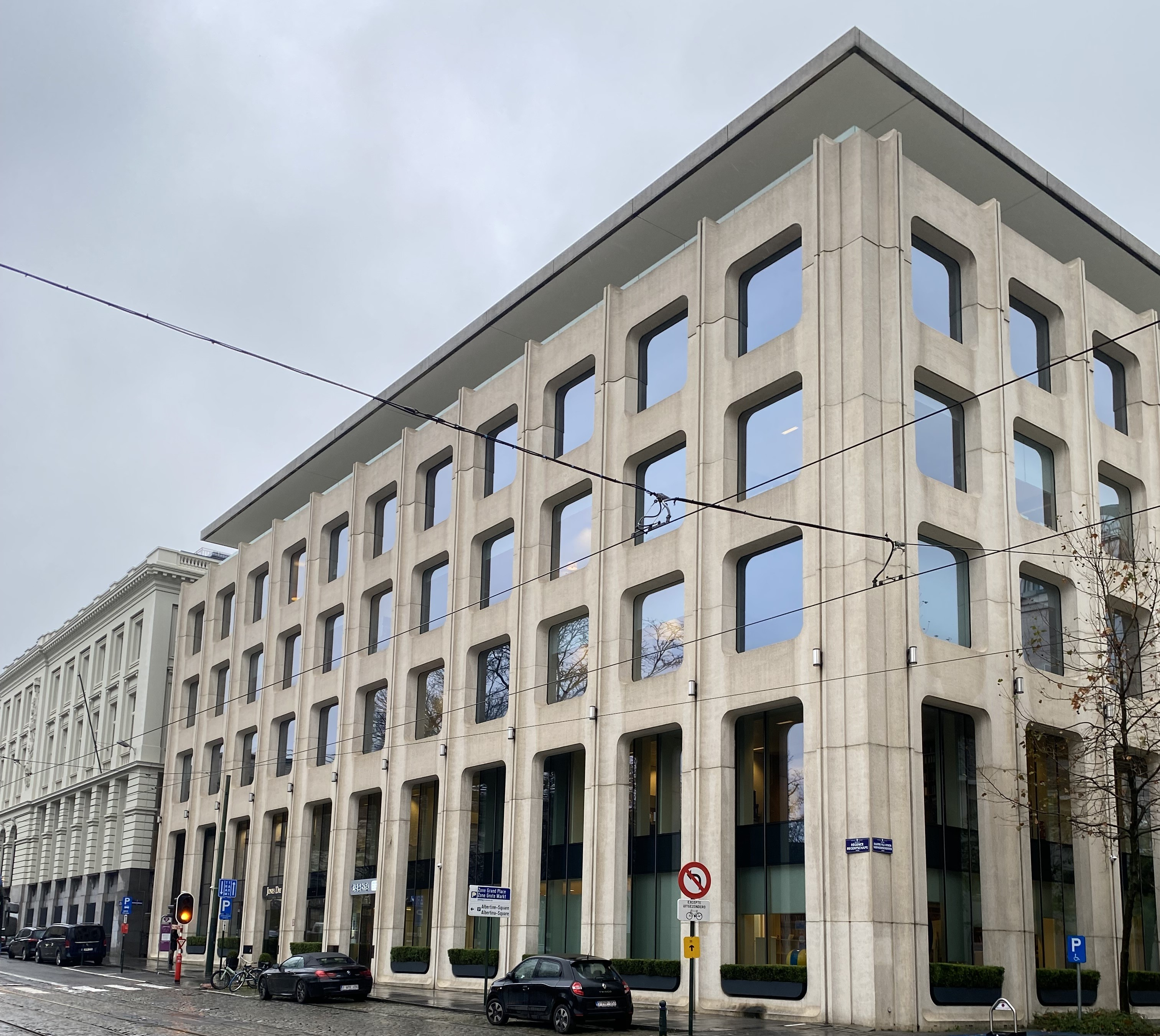
Building at Rue de la Régence 4 in Brussels, head office of Euroclear from 1985 to 1992

On 21 July 1967, the Belgian branch of Morgan Guaranty Trust Company launched a pilot securities settlement service for the Brussels eurobond market, the forerunner of the Euroclear System. On 2 December 1968, this was formally marketed as Euro-clear, marking the birth of the first ICSD. Kidder Peabody had been the first major trading firm to tell the market that it would only deal with firms that cleared through Euroclear. Euroclear's creation provoked a reaction in Luxembourg among firms which competed with Morgan and feared that Morgan could use their settlement data to its trading advantage. This led to the launch of a competitor, Luxembourg-based Cedel, in September 1970.

On 7 July 1972, Euro-clear Clearance System Ltd, a non-resident English company domiciled in Switzerland, was founded by shareholders including over 120 major financial institutions. On 1 December 1972, Euro-clear Clearance System Ltd purchased the Euroclear System from Morgan, which however kept operating it. In June 1983, Euroclear introduced computerized securities lending and borrowing. On 21 November 1986, Euroclear's legal construct was complemented with the creation of Euro-clear Clearance System Société Coopérative in Brussels.

On 31 December 2000, the system's operation was transferred from Morgan to the newly created Euroclear Bank. On 1 June 2001, Euroclear Clearance System, the parent entity of Euroclear Bank, changed its name to Euroclear plc.

Euroclear took a 20% stake in the capital of LCH.Clearnet, by then an Anglo-French entity responsible for the clearing of stock trades on Euronext and the London Stock Exchange.

Euroclear then engaged in a series of acquisitions of national CSDs. It acquired France's Sicovam in 2001, then the Netherlands' Necigef and the UK's CRESTCo in 2002. These local CSDs were renamed respectively as Euroclear France, Euroclear Nederland, and Euroclear UK & Ireland. On 1 January 2005, a new Belgian intermediate holding company, Euroclear SA/NV, was created as the owner of Euroclear Bank, the Euroclear national CSDs, and the shared technology and services supplied to them. In 2006 Euroclear completed the long-planned acquisition of Belgium's CIK, then in October 2008 purchased the Nordic Central Securities Depository comprising Finland's APK (Suomen Arvopaperikeskus Oy) and Sweden's VPC (Värdepapperscentralen AB), which had merged in 2004; the respective entities were renamed Euroclear Belgium, Euroclear Finland, and Euroclear Sweden. In July 2004, Euroclear also announced it would create a single technical platform known as ESES (for "Euroclear Settlement of Euronext-zone Securities"). The ESES project was implemented in 2007-2009, bringing together its three CSDs in Belgium, France and the Netherlands, all of which serve securities traded on Euronext.

In May 2013, Euroclear and the US Depository Trust & Clearing Corporation (DTCC) offered access to each other’s vast inventory of collaterals. While the initial offering provided a two-way automatic transfer and retention of collaterals, it was intended to evolve as a single pool of depositories. In April 2014, Euroclear linked its system to the Central Latinoamericana de Valores to open Panama to international investors, thus creating a single pool of liquidity. In February 2015, Mexico opened up its corporate bonds to Euroclear's trading platform, hoping it will facilitate and increase raising funds for its development programs. In 2016, the three ESES CSDs were connected with the Eurosystem's TARGET2-Securities (T2S) securities settlement system.

In 2018 in anticipation of Brexit, the ownership of the Euroclear Group was transferred from Euroclear plc in London to the newly established Euroclear Holding SA/NV in Brussels, with the stated aim of remaining in the European Union.

Euroclear entered the market of funds (including exchange-traded fund and private market assets launching FundsPlace also thanks to the acquisition of MFEX in 2021 and Goji in 2023. In 2021 as another consequence of Brexit, the depository role for Irish securities was transferred from Euroclear UK & Ireland to Euroclear Bank, following which the former CSD was renamed Euroclear UK & International.

On 1 October 2024, Euroclear simplified its group structure. Until then, Euroclear Holding SA/NV had owned the Euroclear group entities via several intermediate holding companies: Euroclear AG in Baar, Switzerland, which in turn owned Euroclear Investments SA in Belgium, which in turn owned Euroclear SA/NV in Belgium, which in turn owned Euroclear Bank and Euroclear's national CSDs. As part of the legal restructuring, both Euroclear AG and Euroclear Investments SA were merged into Euroclear Holding SA/NV. On 1 february 2025, Euroclear Bank announced that it has received approval for a branch licence in Singapore. The Singapore Euroclear Bank branch will replace the previous Representative office status.

=== Frozen Russian central bank reserves ===
Euroclear Bank has been under the spotlight since late February 2022 because it is where most of the reserves of the Bank of Russia are deposited, that were immobilized in the context of international sanctions during the Russo-Ukrainian War. Euroclear holds about €200 billion of Russian central bank reserves. In March 2025, Euroclear was authorised by Belgium, its principal legal authority, to make payouts from the frozen assets. In 2024, interest from investing the frozen Russian funds came to €4 billion, which was earmarked to fund a G7 loan to Ukraine.

As of October 2025, according to Reuters, of €185 billion held by Euroclear, about €176 billion of the Russian assets have turned into cash and the remaining €9 billion worth of securities are set to mature in 2026 and 2027.

== Operations ==
Following the 2018 Brexit-related relocation, the Euroclear Group's parent entity is Euroclear Holding SA/NV in Brussels. As of 2023, Euroclear SA/NV operated branches in Amsterdam, London, and Paris, in addition to Euroclear Bank's own branch network.

The Euroclear entities settle domestic and international securities transactions, covering bonds, equities, derivatives, and investment funds. Euroclear provides securities services to financial institutions located in more than 90 countries. In addition to Euroclear Bank's role as an international central securities depository (ICSD), Euroclear also operates the CSDs for Belgian, Dutch, Finnish, French, Irish, Swedish, and UK securities. Euroclear also owns EMXCo, the UK's leading provider of investment-fund order routing. Retail investors are able to have direct accounts in local CSDs according to local laws, rules, and procedures.

== Ownership ==
As of 31 January 2025, Euroclear Holding SA/NV's top 10 shareholders held a combined 80.67 percent of Euroclear's equity capital:

- Sicovam Holding S.A. (former shareholders of Sicovam before the 2001 merger with Euroclear): 15.89 percent
- Caisse des Dépôts et Consignations (France): 11.41 percent
- SFPI-FPIM (Belgium): 9.85 percent
- Consortium of Belgian shareholders (also including SFPI-FPIM, see below): 9.17 percent
- New Zealand Superannuation Fund (via NZSF Euro Ltd): 8.67 percent
- State Administration of Foreign Exchange (China, via Kuri Atyak Investment Ltd): 7.25 percent
- Novo Holdings A/S: 4.99 percent
- GIC (Singapore, via Amber Red Investment Pte Ltd): 4.99 percent
- New South Wales Treasury (Australia, via JPMorgan Chase Bank as custodian for NSW TCorp): 4.92 percent
- Euronext Brussels SA: 3.53 percent

The Belgian consortium that held 9.17 percent of Euroclear was formed of seven institutions: AG Insurance, Belfius Insurance, Ethias, Fédérale Assurance (Association d’assurances mutuelles sur la Vie), Participatiemaatschappij Vlaanderen, the Regional Investment Company of Wallonia, and SFPI-FPIM. The latter held 3.07 percent via the consortium, in addition to its 9.85 percent direct stake.

== Leadership ==
=== Chairs ===
- Rolf Hallberg, Chairman 1972-1976
- Georges Streichenberg, Chairman 1976-1980
- Ian Steers, Chairman 1980-1984
- Rolf-Ernst Breuer, Chairman 1984-1998
- Andrew Large, Chairman 1998-2000
- Chris Tupker, Chairman 2000-2006
- Nigel Wicks, Chairman 2006-2012
- Marc-Antoine Autheman, Chairman 2012-2020
- Francesco Vanni d’Archirafi, Chairman since July 2021

=== Chief Executives ===
- Robert Wilmers, General Manager 1973-1978
- Paul Caron, General Manager 1978-1982
- Tom Fox, General Manager 1982-1985
- Peter Culver, General Manager 1985-1987
- Tom Ketchum, General Manager 1987-1991
- John T. Olds, General Manager 1991-1994
- Luc Bomans, General Manager 1994-2000
- Pierre Francotte, CEO 2000-2010
- Tim Howell, CEO 2010-2016
- Lieve Mostrey, CEO 2016-2024
- Valérie Urbain, CEO since May 2024

== See also ==
- Custodian bank – Financial institution providing safekeeping and securities services
- Depository Trust & Clearing Corporation – US financial infrastructure company
- European Central Securities Depositories Association – 1997 European trade association
- Settlement (finance) – Physical exchange of securities or payment
- List of banks in the euro area
- List of banks in Belgium
