= BELFOX =

The Belgium Futures and Options Exchange (BELFOX) was the derivatives exchange of Belgium that was established in 1991 and merged with the Brussels Stock Exchange in 2000. Belfox was founded as a cooperation between important players in the Belgian financial markets. The Belfox market offered electronic trading and clearing facilities on derivatives (futures and options). The underlying values were stocks of major Belgian companies.

== History ==
The exchange was established in 1991.

A new advanced trading system BTS was launched in 1998, intending to increase instrument and enhance speed flexibility.

Jos Schmitt acted as CEO until Belfox merged with the Brussels stock exchange and CIK, forming BXS (Brussels eXchangeS). This merger took place in 2000, and BXS merged with French and Dutch stock exchange companies into Euronext. A new exchange under the NYSE Euronext banner was opened, consolidating other Euronext exchanges in November 2007. The new exchange is called formally NYSE EURONEXT - EURONEXT BRUSSELS - DERIVATIVES.

The code for the exchange was BEL20, with an ISIN BE0389555039. It comprises 20 stocks. The Reuters Exchange mnemonic for Belfox was 'b'. It had an ISO MIC of XBFO. The replacement exchange had an ISO MIC of XBRD.
