= Ticker symbol =

Abbreviation identifying specific shares

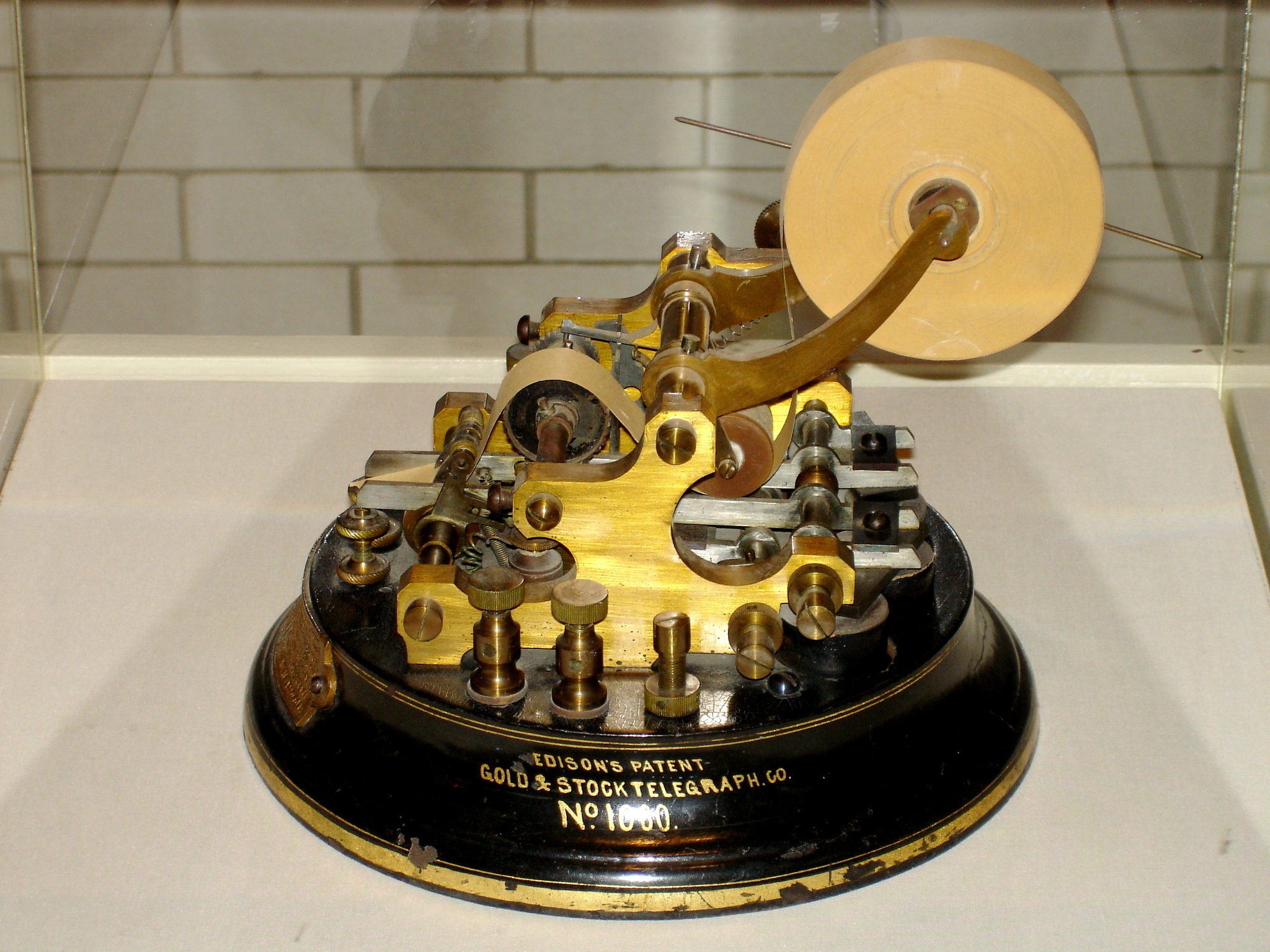
Stock telegraph ticker machine invented by Edward A. Calahan

A ticker symbol or stock symbol is an abbreviation used to uniquely identify publicly traded shares of a particular publicly listed company or security on a particular stock exchange. Ticker symbols are arrangements of symbols or characters (generally Latin letters or digits) which provide a shorthand for investors to refer to, purchase, and research securities. Some exchanges include ticker extensions, which encode additional information such as share class, bankruptcy status, or voting rights into the ticker.

The first ticker symbol was used in 1867, following the invention of the ticker tape machine by Edward Calahan. It was used to identify shares of the Union Pacific Railroad Company.

== Interpreting the symbol ==
Stock symbols are unique identifiers assigned to each security traded on a particular market. A stock symbol can consist of letters, numbers, or a combination of both, and is a way to uniquely identify that stock. The symbols were kept as short as possible to reduce the number of characters that had to be printed on the ticker tape, and to make it easy to recognize by traders and investors.

The allocation of symbols and formatting conventions is specific to each stock exchange. In the US, for example, stock tickers are typically between 1 and 4 letters and represent the company name where possible. For example, US-based computer company stock Apple Inc. traded on the NASDAQ exchange has the symbol AAPL, while the motor company Ford's stock that is traded on the New York Stock Exchange has the single-letter ticker F. In Europe, most exchanges use three-letter codes; for example, British-Dutch consumer goods company Unilever traded on the Amsterdam Euronext exchange has the symbol UNA and London Stock Exchange has the symbol ULVR. In Asia, numbers are often used as stock tickers to avoid issues for international investors when using non-Latin scripts. For example, the bank HSBC's stock traded on the Hong Kong Stock Exchange has the ticker symbol 5, New York Stock Exchange has the ticker symbol HSBC (bank abbreviation) and London Stock Exchange has the ticker HSBA.

Symbols sometimes change to reflect mergers. Prior to the 1999 merger with Mobil Oil, Exxon used a phonetic spelling of the company "XON" as its ticker symbol. The symbol of the firm after the merger was "XOM". Symbols are sometimes reused. In the US the single-letter symbols are particularly sought after as vanity symbols. For example, since March 2008 Visa Inc. has used the symbol V that had previously been used by Vivendi which had delisted and given up the symbol.

To fully qualify a stock, both the ticker and the exchange or country of listing needs to be known. On many systems both must be specified to uniquely identify the security. This is often done by appending the location or exchange code to the ticker.

Example Vodafone Group plc stock ticker symbol
Location	Reuters Instrument Code	Bloomberg ticker	Yahoo ticker
London Stock Exchange	VOD.L	VOD:LN	VOD.L
Nasdaq	VOD.O or VOD.OQ	VOD:US	VOD
Stock Exchange of Singapore	VOD.SI	VOD:SP	VOD.SI

=== Other identifiers ===
Although stock tickers identify a security, they are exchange-dependent, generally limited to stocks, and can change. These limitations have led to the development of other codes in financial markets to identify securities for settlement purposes. The most prevalent of these is the International Securities Identifying Number (ISIN). An ISIN uniquely identifies a security and its structure is defined in ISO 6166. Securities for which ISINs are issued include bonds, commercial paper, stocks, and warrants. The ISIN code is a 12-character alpha-numerical code that does not contain information characterizing financial instruments, but serves for uniform identification of a security at trading and settlement.

The ISIN identifies the security, not the exchange (if any) on which it trades; it is, therefore, not a replacement for the ticker symbol. For instance, Mercedes-Benz Group stock trades on twenty-two different stock exchanges worldwide and is priced in five foreign currencies; it has the same ISIN on each (DE0007100000), though not the same ticker symbol. ISIN cannot specify a particular trade in this case, and another identifier, typically the three- or four-letter exchange code (such as the Market Identifier Code), will have to be specified in addition to the ISIN.

=== Symbol for stock market indices ===
While usually a stock ticker identifies a security that can be traded, stock market indices are also sometimes assigned a symbol, even though they can generally not be traded. Symbols for indices are usually distinguished by adding a symbol in front of the name, such as a circumflex (or 'caret') ^ or a dot. For example, Reuters lists the Nasdaq Composite index under the symbol .IXIC.

== Symbols by country ==
=== Australia ===
In Australia the Australian Securities Exchange uses the following conventions: Three character base symbol with the first and third character being alphanumeric and the second alphabetic. ETFs and ETMFs can be either 3 or 4 characters. Exchange-traded warrants and exchange-traded options are six characters. ETOs can have numbers in the sixth character.

ASX fourth, fifth, and sixth-letter codes extensions
D[A–Z]	Deferred settlement security, temporary code used typically during a consolidation/reverse split. Used for both Equities and Company Options.
H[A–Z]	Bonds/Debt
F[A-Z][A–Z]	Exchanged-traded Warrants
G or G[A–Z]	Convertible Debt
H or H[A–Z]	Unsecured Note
I[A–Z][A–Z]	Instalment Warrant
LV	Non-Voting or Limited Voting
O or O[A–G]	Company option
P[A–Z]	Preference/Interest Bearing security
R or R[A–Z]	Company rights
W[A–Z][A–Z]	Exchanged-traded Warrants
U[A–Z][A–Z]	Exchanged-traded Warrants
V[A–Z][A–Z]	Exchanged-traded Warrants

=== Canada ===
In Canada the Toronto Stock Exchange TSX and the TSXV use the following special codes after the ticker symbol:

TSX "behind the dot" extensions and other special codes
A–B – class of shares	NO, NS, NT – notes	S – special U.S. terms
DB – debenture	P – Capital Pool Company	U, V – U.S. funds
E – equity dividend	PR – preferred	UN – units
H – NEX market	R – subscription receipts	W – when issued
IR – installment receipts	RT – rights	WT – warrants

=== United Kingdom ===
In the United Kingdom, prior to 1996, stock codes were known as EPICs, named after the London Stock Exchange's Exchange Price Information Computer (e.g.: "MKS" for Marks and Spencer). Following the introduction of the Sequence trading platform in 1996, EPICs were renamed Tradable Instrument Display Mnemonics (TIDM), but they are still widely referred to as EPICs. Stocks can also be identified using their SEDOL (Stock Exchange Daily Official List) number or their ISIN (International Securities Identification Number).

=== United States ===
In the United States, modern letter-only ticker symbols were developed by Standard & Poor's (S&P) to bring a national standard to investing. Previously, a single company could have many ticker symbols as they varied between the dozens of individual stock markets. The term ticker refers to the noise made by the ticker tape machines once widely used by stock exchanges.

The S&P system was later standardized by the securities industry and modified as the years passed. Stock symbols for preferred stock have not been standardized.

Some companies use a well-known product as their ticker symbol. Belgian brewer AB InBev, the brewer of Budweiser beer, uses "BUD" (symbolizing its premier product in the United States) as its three-letter ticker for American Depository Receipts. Its rival, the Molson Coors Brewing Company, uses a similarly beer-related symbol, "TAP". Likewise, Southwest Airlines pays tribute to its headquarters at Love Field in Dallas through its "LUV" symbol. Six Flags Entertainment Corporation, which operates large amusement parks in the United States, uses "FUN" as its symbol. Acushnet Company uses "GOLF," as the company sells products related with golf. Harley-Davidson uses "HOG", an abbreviation for the corporate-sponsored Harley Owners Group. Yamana Gold uses "AUY", because on the periodic table of elements, "Au" is the symbol for gold. Sotheby's, an auction house, previously used the symbol "BID". Petco uses the symbol "WOOF," referencing a dog's bark (even though the corporate logo features both a dog and a cat).

While most symbols come from the company's name, sometimes it happens the other way around. Tricon Global, owner of KFC, Pizza Hut and Taco Bell, adopted the symbol "YUM" to represent its corporate mission when the company was spun out of PepsiCo in 1997. In 2002, the company changed its name to match its symbol, adopting the name Yum! Brands.

Symbols sometimes change to reflect mergers. Before the 1999 merger with Mobil, Exxon used a phonetic spelling of the company "XON" as its ticker symbol. The symbol of the firm after the merger was "XOM". After Hewlett-Packard merged with Compaq, the new firm took on the ticker symbol "HPQ". (The former symbols were HWP and CPQ.) AT&T's ticker symbol is "T"; accordingly, the company is referred to simply as "Telephone" on Wall Street (the T symbol is so well known that when SBC purchased the company, it took the AT&T name, capitalizing on its history and keeping the desired single letter symbol).

Some examples of US Stock symbols include:

- A – Agilent Technologies
- AAPL – Apple
- BRK.(A/B) - Berkshire Hathaway (Class A or B shares marked by a letter following period, BRK.A or BRK.B)
- C – Citigroup
- GOLF - Acushnet Company
- GOOG – Alphabet (parent company of Google)
- HOG – Harley-Davidson
- HPQ - Hewlett-Packard
- INTC – Intel
- KO – The Coca-Cola Company
- LUV - Southwest Airlines (after their main hub at Love Field)
- MMM – 3M (originally known as Minnesota Mining and Manufacturing)
- MSFT – Microsoft
- T - AT&T
- TGT – Target Corporation
- TXN – Texas Instruments
- XOM - ExxonMobil
- WOOF - Petco
- WMT – Walmart
- ZEUS - Olympic Steel

Formerly, a glance at a U.S. stock symbol and its appended codes would allow an investor to determine where a stock trades; however, in July 2007, the SEC approved a rule change allowing companies moving from the New York Stock Exchange to the Nasdaq to retain their three-letter symbols; DirecTV was one of the first companies to make this move. When first implemented, the rule change did not apply to companies with one or two-letter symbols, but subsequently any stock was able to move from the NYSE to the Nasdaq without changing its symbol. CA Technologies, which traded under the symbol CA before it was acquired by Broadcom Inc. in 2018, moved from the NYSE to the Nasdaq in April 2008 and kept its two-letter symbol.

NYSE "behind the dot" or Nasdaq fifth-letter codes and other special codes
A – Class "A"	K – Nonvoting (common)	U – Units
B – Class "B"	L – Miscellaneous	V – Pending issue and distribution
C – NextShares	M – fourth class – preferred shares	W – Warrants
D – New issue or reverse split	N – third class – preferred shares	X – Mutual fund
E – Delinquent SEC filings	O – second class – preferred shares	Y – American depositary receipt (ADR) (used on the over-the-counter market)
F – Foreign (used on the over-the-counter market)	P – first class preferred shares	Z – Miscellaneous situations
G – first convertible bond	Q – In bankruptcy	Special codes
H – second convertible bond	R – Rights	PK – A Pink Sheet, indicating over-the-counter
I – third convertible bond	S – Shares of beneficial interest	SC – Nasdaq Small Cap
J – Voting share – special	T – With warrants or rights	NM – Nasdaq National Market

==== Single-letter NYSE ticker symbols ====
- A: Agilent Technologies (previously used by Anaconda Copper, American Medical Buildings, Attwoods, and Astra AB)
- B: Barrick Mining Corporation (previously used by Barnes Group, Bankers Utilities Corporation, and Baldwin Lima Hamilton)
- C: Citigroup (previously used by Chrysler)
- D: Dominion Energy (previously used by Douglas Aircraft Company and Dart Industries)
- E: Eni (previously used by Erie Lackawanna Railway and Transco Energy Co.)
- F: Ford
- G: Genpact (previously used by Greyhound Dial Corporation and Gillette)
- H: Hyatt (previously used by Hupp Corporation, Hardee's, Harcourt General, Helm Resources, and Realogy)
- J: Jacobs Solutions (previously used by J Net Enterprises and Standard Oil Co. of New Jersey)
- L: Loews Corporation (previously used by Liberty Financial Companies, Sinclair Oil Corp, and Liberty Media)
- M: Macy's Inc. (previously used by Marcor)
- O: Realty Income Corporation (previously used by Odetics)
- P: Everpure (previously used by Pandora and Phillips Petroleum Company)
- Q: Qnity Electronics (previously used by Quintiles and Qwest)
- R: Ryder (previously used by Uniroyal and LF Rothschild)
- S: SentinelOne (previously used by Sprint Corporation and Sears)
- T: AT&T (previously used by AT&T Corporation)
- U: Unity Software (previously used by US Airways)
- V: Visa (previously used by Vivendi; New York, New Haven & Hartford Railroad; Irving Bank; Vivra; and Viking General)
- W: Wayfair (previously used by Westvaco)

Unassigned letters:

- I: previously used by Intelsat, Itel Corporation, and First Interstate Bancorp
- K: previously used by Kellanova until acquisition by Mars, Inc. on December 11, 2025.
- N: previously used by Inco and NetSuite
- X: previously used by US Steel until its 2025 acquisition by Nippon Steel (TYO: 5401)
- Y: previously used by Alleghany Corporation
- Z: previously used by Woolworth Corporation

==== Single-letter NASDAQ ticker symbols ====
- Z: Zillow

Unassigned letters:

- A–Y

=== Other countries ===
In countries where Arabic script is used, and in East Asia, transliterated Latin script versions of company names may be confusing to an unpracticed Western reader; stock symbols provide a simple means of clear communication in the workplace. Many Asian countries use numerical or alphanumerical ticker symbols of only digits and Roman letters to facilitate international trade.

- Industrial and Commercial Bank of China – 601398 [Shanghai], 1398 [Hong Kong]
- HSBC – 00005 [Hong Kong], HSBC [New York], HSBA [London]
- DBS Bank – D05 [Singapore]
- Jardine Cycle & Carriage – C07 [Singapore]
- Eneos Holdings – 5020 [Tokyo & Nagoya – Japan]
- Toshiba – 6502 [Tokyo – Japan] (formerly, until went private in 2023 by Japan Industrial Partners)
- China CITIC Bank Ltd – 601998 [Shanghai – China], 00988 [Hong Kong]
- Hubei Golden Ring Co Ltd – 000615 [Shenzhen – China]
- Taiwan Semiconductor Manufacturing – 2330 [Taiwan], TSM [New York]
- Asus – 2357 [Taiwan]
- Chunghwa Telecom – 2412 [Taiwan], CHT [New York]
- Saudi Electricity Company - 5110 [Saudi Arabia]

== See also ==
- Central Index Key
- CUSIP
- Market identification code
- Option symbol
- SEDOL
- ISIN
- Wertpapierkennnummer
