= Market Identifier Code =

Standardized identifier of financial markets

The Market Identifier Code (MIC) (ISO 10383) is a unique identification code used to identify securities trading exchanges, regulated and non-regulated trading markets. The MIC is a four alphanumeric character code, and is defined in ISO 10383 by the International Organization for Standardization (ISO). For example, the US NASDAQ market is identified by MIC XNAS.

== ISO 10383 ==
ISO 10383 is the ISO standard that "specifies a universal method of identifying exchanges, trading platforms and regulated or non-regulated markets as sources of prices and related information in order to facilitate automated processing". The FIX Protocol uses MICs to denote values of the "Fix Exchange" data type. Markets of various asset classes, including equities, options and futures apply for MICs through the ISO.

MICs are updated frequently and the latest published list is available at the maintenance organization of ISO 10383 in various formats: Excel, CSV, XML and PDF. These also include Modified and Deactivated MICs, as well as change lists since the last published update.

== Exchange (operating MIC) vs Market (MIC) ==
MICs are allocated at two levels:

- Exchange (operating MIC).
  - E.g. NASDAQ has code XNAS
- Market (MIC), where the exchange's operating MIC is also used as MIC of its main market or "all" markets. E.g. NASDAQ markets have these MICs:
  - XNAS: NASDAQ - All Markets
  - XNCM: NASDAQ Capital Market
  - XNDQ: NASDAQ Options Market
  - XNFI: NASDAQ Fixed Income Trading
  - XNGS: NASDAQ/NGS (Global Select Market)
  - XNIM: NASDAQ Intermarket

ISO 10383 specifies all MICs and is updated regularly.

== Market Categories ==
MIC also standardizes codes for categories of markets or facilities, as follows:

- APPA: Approved Publication Arrangement
- ARMS: Approved Reporting Mechanism
- ATSS: Alternative Trading System
- CASP: Crypto Asset Services Provider, such as Cryptocurrency exchanges and related facilities
- CTPS: Consolidated Tape Provider
- DCMS: Designated Contract Market
- IDQS: Inter-Dealer Quotation System, e.g. OTC Markets Group and the Consolidated Quotation System
- MLTF: Multilateral Trading Facility
- OTFS: Organised Trading Facility
- RMKT: Regulated Market, e.g. a regulated Stock Exchange
- RMOS: Recognised Market Operator
- SEFS: Swap Execution Facility
- SINT: Systematic Internaliser, as defined in the Markets in financial instruments directive 2 (MiFID 2): Directive 2014/65/EU, e.g. XTX Markets
- TRFS: Trade Reporting Facility

There are also additional codes NSPD (Not Specified) and OTHR (Other), which together constitute about 54% of all codes.

== See also ==
- Outline of finance
- International Securities Identification Number (ISIN)
- SEDOL
- CUSIP
- Ticker symbol
- Central Index Key
- ISO 6166
- ISO 10962
- NSIN
