= ISO 10962 =

Standard for financial instrument codes

ISO 10962, known as Classification of Financial Instruments (CFI), is a six-letter-code used in the financial services industry to classify and describe the structure and function of a financial instrument (in the form of security or contract) as part of the instrument reference data. It is an international standard approved by the International Organization for Standardization (ISO). CFI have been required since 1 July 2017.

The CFI is attributed to a financial instrument at the time when the financial instrument is issued and when it is allocated an International Securities Identification Number (ISIN) by the respective national numbering agency (NNA). It will normally not change during the life of that instrument.

Each of the six letters of the CFI represents a specific characteristic of the financial instrument (e.g. ESVUFB is used to describe a typical registered share). Those capital letters are drawn from the ISO basic Latin alphabet. The first letter of the code is the Category: E for Equity (shares and other instruments of that nature), D for Debt (particularly bonds), C for Collective Investment Vehicles, (i.e. investment funds). The subsequent letters define the type of instrument for that category.

The purpose of ISO 10962 is to provide a standard for describing all financial instruments that can be recognized world-wide by all operators and computer systems in the financial markets and banking industries. The Classification of financial instrument Code is used to define and describe financial instruments as a uniform set of codes for all market participants. The code is issued by the members of ANNA, the Association of National Numbering Agencies. The group promotes the structure to increase its use by non-governmental market participants.

== History of ISO 10962 Modification ==
- Standard was first accepted and published in 1997 as ISO 10962:1997
- Its first revision, published in 2001, was ISO 10962:2001
- In 2006, FIX Protocol group published a proposal for changes of the standard for Consultation.
- The standard was subsequently revised and published as ISO 10962:2015.
- A further revision, ISO 10962:2019, mainly addressed OTC derivatives but was later replaced by ISO 10962:2021, which is the current active version published by ISO in 2021.

== Background and Goals of Introduction ==
Where distinct entities transact it is seen as helpful to establish a common transaction language. The CFI code is meant to provide the most comprehensive information possible, while at the same time maintaining the code manageability, provides a standard for identification of type of instrument and their main high level characteristics, determined by the intrinsic characteristics of the financial instrument, which would be independent of the individual names or conventions of a given country or financial institution. This principle avoids confusion arising from different linguistic usage as well as redundancy, while allowing an objective comparison of the instruments across markets.

CFI codes also aim to simplify electronic communication between participants, improve understanding of the characteristics of financial instruments for the investors, and allow securities grouping in a consistent manner for reporting and categorization purposes.

== Structure of CFI Code ==
- The first character indicates the highest level of category of the Security.
- The second character refers to the groups within each category.
- The next four characters refer to four attributes, that varies between groups.
- The letter X always means Not Appl./Undefined.

== Structure of CFI Code ==
CFI Category	CFI Group	Attribute 1	Attribute 2	Attribute 3	Attribute 4
E = Equities	S = Shares i.e. Common / Ordinary	Voting Right: V = Voting; N = Non-Voting; R = Restricted; E = Enhanced voting	Ownership: T = Restrictions; U = Free	Payment Status: F = Fully Paid; O = Nil Paid; P = Partly Paid	Form: B = Bearer; R = Registered; N = Bearer/Registered; M = Others (Misc.)
E = Equities	P = Preferred shares	Voting Right: V = Voting; N = Non-Voting; R = Restricted; E = Enhanced voting	Redemption: R = Redeemable; E = Extendible; T = Redeemable / Extendible; G = Exchangeable; A = Redeemable / Exchangeable / Extendible; C = Redeemable/Exchangeable; N = Perpetual	Income: F = Fixed Rate; C = Cumulative, Fixed Rate; P = Participating; Q = Cumulative, Participating; A = Adjustable/Variable Rate; N = Normal Rate; U = Auction Rate; D = Dividends	Form: B = Bearer; R = Registered; N = Bearer/Registered; M = Others (Misc.)
E = Equities	C = Convertible shares	Voting Right: V = Voting; N = Non-Voting; R = Restricted; E = Enhanced voting	Ownership: T = Restrictions; U = Free	Payment Status: F = Fully Paid; O = Nil Paid; P = Partly Paid	Form: B = Bearer; R = Registered; N = Bearer/Registered; M = Others (Misc.)
E = Equities	F = Preferred convertible shares	Voting Right: V = Voting; N = Non-Voting; R = Restricted; E = Enhanced voting	Redemption: R = Redeemable; E = Extendible; T = Redeemable / Extendible; G = Exchangeable; A = Redeemable / Exchangeable / Extendible; C = Redeemable/Exchangeable; N = Perpetual	Income: F = Fixed Rate; C = Cumulative, Fixed Rate; P = Participating; Q = Cumulative, Participating; A = Adjustable/Variable Rate; N = Normal Rate; U = Auction Rate; D = Dividends	Form: B = Bearer; R = Registered; N = Bearer/Registered; M = Others (Misc.)
E = Equities	L = Limited partnership units	Voting Right: V = Voting; N = Non-Voting; R = Restricted; E = Enhanced voting	Ownership: T = Restrictions; U = Free	Payment Status: F = Fully Paid; O = Nil Paid; P = Partly Paid	Form: B = Bearer; R = Registered; N = Bearer/Registered; M = Others (Misc.)
E = Equities	D = Depository receipts on equities	Instrument dependency: S = Common/Ordinary Shares; P = Preferred/Preference Shares; C = Common/Ordinary Convertible Shares; F = Preferred/Preference Convertible Shares; L = Limited Partnership Units; M = Others (Misc.)	Redemption / Conversion of the Underlying Asset: R = Redeemable; N = Perpetual; B = Convertible; D = Convertible/Redeemable; X = Not Appl./Undefined	Income: F = Fixed Rate; C = Cumulative, Fixed Rate; P = Participating; Q = Cumulative, Participating; A = Adjustable/Variable Rate; N = Normal Rate; U = Auction Rate; D = Dividends	Form: B = Bearer; R = Registered; N = Bearer/Registered; M = Others (Misc.)
E = Equities	Y = Structured instruments (participation)	Type: A = Tracker Certificate; B = Outperforming Certificate; C = Bonus Certificate; D = Outperformance Bonus Certificate; E = Twin-Win-Certificate; M = Others (Misc.)	Distribution: D = Dividend Payments; Y = No Payments; M = Others (Misc.)	Repayment: F = Cash Repayment; V = Physical Repayment; E = Elect at Settlement; M = Others (Misc.)	Underlying asset: 1. B = Baskets; S = Equities; D = Debt Instruments; 1. G = Derivatives; T = Commodities; C = Currencies; I = Indices; 1. N = Interest rates; M = Others (Misc.)
E = Equities	R = Preference shares	Voting Right: V = Voting; N = Non-Voting; R = Restricted; E = Enhanced voting	Redemption: R = Redeemable; E = Extendible; T = Redeemable / Extendible; G = Exchangeable; A = Redeemable / Exchangeable / Extendible; C = Redeemable/Exchangeable; N = Perpetual	Income: F = Fixed Rate; C = Cumulative, Fixed Rate; P = Participating; Q = Cumulative, Participating; A = Adjustable/Variable Rate; N = Normal Rate; U = Auction Rate; D = Dividends	Form: B = Bearer; R = Registered; N = Bearer/Registered; M = Others (Misc.)
E = Equities	V = Preference convertibles shares	Voting Right: V = Voting; N = Non-Voting; R = Restricted; E = Enhanced voting	Redemption: R = Redeemable; E = Extendible; T = Redeemable / Extendible; G = Exchangeable; A = Redeemable / Exchangeable / Extendible; C = Redeemable/Exchangeable; N = Perpetual	Income: F = Fixed Rate; C = Cumulative, Fixed Rate; P = Participating; Q = Cumulative, Participating; A = Adjustable/Variable Rate; N = Normal Rate; U = Auction Rate; D = Dividends	Form: B = Bearer; R = Registered; N = Bearer/Registered; M = Others (Misc.)
E = Equities	U = Units (from Unit trusts, Mutual funds, OPCVM or OICVM)	Closed/open-end: C = Closed-end; O = Open-end	Distribution policy: I = Income funds; G = Growth funds; M = Mixed funds	Assets: R = Real estate; S = Securities; M = Mixed-general; C = Commodities; D = Derivatives	Form: B = Bearer; R = Registered; N = Bearer/Registered; 1. Z = Bearer depository receipt 2. A = Registered depository receipt; M = Others (Misc.)
E = Equities	M = Others (Misc.)	X = Not Appl./Undefined	X = Not Appl./Undefined	X = Not Appl./Undefined	Form: B = Bearer; R = Registered; N = Bearer/Registered; M = Others (Misc.)
D = Debt Instruments	B = Bonds	Type of interest: F = Fixed rate; Z = Zero rate / discounted rate; V = Variable; C = Cash payment; K = payment in kind	Guarantee: T = Government / State Guarantee; G = Joint Guarantee; S = Secured; U = Unsecured / Unguaranteed; P = Negative Pledge; N = Senior; O = Senior Subordinated; Q = Junior; J = Junior Subordinated; C = Supranational	Redemption/Reimbursement: F = Fixed Maturity; G = Fixed Maturity with Call Feature; C = Fixed Maturity with Put Feature; D = Fixed Maturity with Put and Call; A = Amortization Plan; B = Amortization Plan with Call Feature; T = Amortization Plan with Put Feature; L = Amortization Plan with Put and Call; P = Perpetual; Q = Perpetual with Call Feature; R = Perpetual with Put Feature; E = Extendible	Form: B = Bearer; R = Registered; N = Bearer/Registered; M = Others (Misc.)
D = Debt Instruments	C = Convertible Bonds	Type of interest: F = Fixed rate; Z = Zero rate / discounted rate; V = Variable; C = Cash payment; K = payment in kind	Guarantee: T = Government / State Guarantee; G = Joint Guarantee; S = Secured; U = Unsecured / Unguaranteed; P = Negative Pledge; N = Senior; O = Senior Subordinated; Q = Junior; J = Junior Subordinated; C = Supranational	Redemption/Reimbursement: F = Fixed Maturity; G = Fixed Maturity with Call Feature; C = Fixed Maturity with Put Feature; D = Fixed Maturity with Put and Call; A = Amortization Plan; B = Amortization Plan with Call Feature; T = Amortization Plan with Put Feature; L = Amortization Plan with Put and Call; P = Perpetual; Q = Perpetual with Call Feature; R = Perpetual with Put Feature; E = Extendible	Form: B = Bearer; R = Registered; N = Bearer/Registered; M = Others (Misc.)
D = Debt Instruments	W = Bonds with warrants attached	Type of interest: F = Fixed rate; Z = Zero rate / discounted rate; V = Variable; C = Cash payment; K = payment in kind	Guarantee: T = Government / State Guarantee; G = Joint Guarantee; S = Secured; U = Unsecured / Unguaranteed; P = Negative Pledge; N = Senior; O = Senior Subordinated; Q = Junior; J = Junior Subordinated; C = Supranational	Redemption/Reimbursement: F = Fixed Maturity; G = Fixed Maturity with Call Feature; C = Fixed Maturity with Put Feature; D = Fixed Maturity with Put and Call; A = Amortization Plan; B = Amortization Plan with Call Feature; T = Amortization Plan with Put Feature; L = Amortization Plan with Put and Call; P = Perpetual; Q = Perpetual with Call Feature; R = Perpetual with Put Feature; E = Extendible	Form: B = Bearer; R = Registered; N = Bearer/Registered; M = Others (Misc.)
D = Debt Instruments	T = Medium-term notes	Type of interest: F = Fixed rate; Z = Zero rate / discounted rate; V = Variable; C = Cash payment; K = payment in kind	Guarantee: T = Government / State Guarantee; G = Joint Guarantee; S = Secured; U = Unsecured / Unguaranteed; P = Negative Pledge; N = Senior; O = Senior Subordinated; Q = Junior; J = Junior Subordinated; C = Supranational	Redemption/Reimbursement: F = Fixed Maturity; G = Fixed Maturity with Call Feature; C = Fixed Maturity with Put Feature; D = Fixed Maturity with Put and Call; A = Amortization Plan; B = Amortization Plan with Call Feature; T = Amortization Plan with Put Feature; L = Amortization Plan with Put and Call; P = Perpetual; Q = Perpetual with Call Feature; R = Perpetual with Put Feature; E = Extendible	Form: B = Bearer; R = Registered; N = Bearer/Registered; M = Others (Misc.)
D = Debt Instruments	S = Structured products (with capital protection)	Type: A = Capital Protection Certificate with Participation; B = Capital Protection Convertible Certificate; C = Barrier Capital Protection Certificate; D = Capital Protection Certificate with Coupons; M = Others (Misc.)	Distribution: F = Fixed Interest Payments; D = Dividend Payments; V = Variable Interest Payments; Y = No Payments; M = Others (Misc.)	Repayment: F = Fixed Cash Repayment (Only Protected Capital Level); V = Variable Cash Repayment; M = Others (Misc.)	Underlying asset: 1. B = Baskets; S = Equities; D = Debt Instruments / Interest Rates; T = Commodities; C = Currencies; I = Indices; M = Others (Misc.)
D = Debt Instruments	E = Structured products (without capital protection)	Type: A = Discount Certificate; B = Barrier Discount Certificate; C = Reverse Convertible; D = Barrier Reverse Convertible; E = Express Certificate; M = Others (Misc.)	Distribution: F = Fixed Interest Payments; D = Dividend Payments; V = Variable Interest Payments; Y = No Payments; M = Others (Misc.)	Repayment: R = Repayment in Cash; S = Repayment in Assets; C = Repayment in Assets and Cash; T = Repayment in Assets or Cash; M = Others (Misc.)	Underlying asset: 1. B = Baskets; S = Equities; D = Debt Instruments / Interest Rates; T = Commodities; C = Currencies; I = Indices; M = Others (Misc.)
D = Debt Instruments	G = Mortgage-backed securities (MBS)	Type of interest: F = Fixed rate; Z = Zero rate / discounted rate; V = Variable	Guarantee: T = Government / State Guarantee; G = Joint Guarantee; S = Secured; U = Unsecured / Unguaranteed; P = Negative Pledge; N = Senior; O = Senior Subordinated; Q = Junior; J = Junior Subordinated; C = Supranational	Redemption/Reimbursement: F = Fixed Maturity; G = Fixed Maturity with Call Feature; C = Fixed Maturity with Put Feature; D = Fixed Maturity with Put and Call; A = Amortization Plan; B = Amortization Plan with Call Feature; T = Amortization Plan with Put Feature; L = Amortization Plan with Put and Call; P = Perpetual; Q = Perpetual with Call Feature; R = Perpetual with Put Feature; E = Extendible	Form: B = Bearer; R = Registered; N = Bearer/Registered; M = Others (Misc.)
D = Debt Instruments	A = Asset backed securities (ABS)	Type of interest: F = Fixed rate; Z = Zero rate / discounted rate; V = Variable	Guarantee: T = Government / State Guarantee; G = Joint Guarantee; S = Secured; U = Unsecured / Unguaranteed; P = Negative Pledge; N = Senior; O = Senior Subordinated; Q = Junior; J = Junior Subordinated; C = Supranational	Redemption/Reimbursement: F = Fixed Maturity; G = Fixed Maturity with Call Feature; C = Fixed Maturity with Put Feature; D = Fixed Maturity with Put and Call; A = Amortization Plan; B = Amortization Plan with Call Feature; T = Amortization Plan with Put Feature; L = Amortization Plan with Put and Call; P = Perpetual; Q = Perpetual with Call Feature; R = Perpetual with Put Feature; E = Extendible	Form: B = Bearer; R = Registered; N = Bearer/Registered; M = Others (Misc.)
D = Debt Instruments	N = Municipal bonds	Type of interest: F = Fixed rate; Z = Zero rate / discounted rate; V = Variable	Guarantee: T = Government / State Guarantee; G = Joint Guarantee; S = Secured; U = Unsecured / Unguaranteed; P = Negative Pledge; N = Senior; O = Senior Subordinated; Q = Junior; J = Junior Subordinated; C = Supranational	Redemption/Reimbursement: F = Fixed Maturity; G = Fixed Maturity with Call Feature; C = Fixed Maturity with Put Feature; D = Fixed Maturity with Put and Call; A = Amortization Plan; B = Amortization Plan with Call Feature; T = Amortization Plan with Put Feature; L = Amortization Plan with Put and Call; P = Perpetual; Q = Perpetual with Call Feature; R = Perpetual with Put Feature; E = Extendible	Form: B = Bearer; R = Registered; N = Bearer/Registered; M = Others (Misc.)
D = Debt Instruments	D = Depository receipts on debt instruments	Instrument dependency: B = Bonds; C = Convertible Bonds; W = Bonds with Warrants Attached; T = Medium-Term Notes; Y = Money Market Instruments; G = Mortgage-Backed Securities; Q = Asset-Backed Securities; N = Municipal Bonds; M = Others (Misc.)	Type of interest/cash payment: F = Fixed Rate; Z = Zero Rate/Discounted; V = Variable; C = Cash Payment	Guarantee: T = Government / State Guarantee; G = Joint Guarantee; S = Secured; U = Unsecured / Unguaranteed; P = Negative Pledge; N = Senior; O = Senior Subordinated; Q = Junior; J = Junior Subordinated; C = Supranational	Redemption/Reimbursement: F = Fixed Maturity; G = Fixed Maturity with Call Feature; C = Fixed Maturity with Put Feature; D = Fixed Maturity with Put and Call; A = Amortization Plan; B = Amortization Plan with Call Feature; T = Amortization Plan with Put Feature; L = Amortization Plan with Put and Call; P = Perpetual; Q = Perpetual with Call Feature; R = Perpetual with Put Feature; E = Extendible
D = Debt Instruments	Y = Money market instruments	Type of interest: F = Fixed Rate; Z = Zero Rate/Discounted; V = Variable; K = Payment in Kind	Guarantee: 1. T = Government / State Guarantee; G = Joint Guarantee; S = Secured; U = Unsecured / Unguaranteed; P = Negative Pledge; N = Senior; O = Senior Subordinated; Q = Junior; J = Junior Subordinated; C = Supranational	X = Not Appl./Undefined	Form: B = Bearer; R = Registered; N = Bearer/Registered; M = Others (Misc.)
D = Debt Instruments	M = Others (Misc.)	Type: B = Bank Loan; P = Promissory Note; M = Others (Misc.)	X = Not Appl./Undefined	X = Not Appl./Undefined	Form: B = Bearer; R = Registered; N = Bearer/Registered; M = Others (Misc.)
C = Collective Investment Vehicles	I = Standard (vanilla)investment funds/mutual funds	Closed / Open-end: O = Open-End; C = Closed-End; M = Others (Misc.)	Distribution Policy: I = Income Funds; G = Accumulation Funds; J = Mixed Funds	Asset R = Real Estate B = Debt Instruments E = Equities V = Convertible Securities L = Mixed C = Commodities D = Derivatives F = Referential Instruments K = Credits M = Others (Misc.)	Security Type and Investors Restrictions: S = Shares; Q = Shares for QI; U = Units; Y = Units for QI
C = Collective Investment Vehicles	H = Hedge funds				
C = Collective Investment Vehicles	B = Real estate investment trusts (REITs)				
C = Collective Investment Vehicles	E = Exchange-traded funds (ETFs)				
C = Collective Investment Vehicles	S = Pension funds				
C = Collective Investment Vehicles	F = Funds of funds				
C = Collective Investment Vehicles	P = Private equity funds				
C = Collective Investment Vehicles	M = Others (Misc.)	X = Not Appl./Undefined	X = Not Appl./Undefined	X = Not Appl./Undefined	Security Type and Investors Restrictions: S = Shares; Q = Shares for QI; U = Units; Y = Units for QI
R = Entitlement (Rights)	A = Allotments (Bonus Rights)	X = Not Appl./Undefined	X = Not Appl./Undefined	X = Not Appl./Undefined	Form: 1. B = Bearer; R = Registered; N = Bearer/Registered; M = Others (Misc.)
R = Entitlement (Rights)	S = Subscription Rights	Asset: S = Common/Ordinary Shares; P = Preferred/Preference Shares; C = Common/Ordinary Convertible Shares; F = Preferred/Preference Convertible Shares; B = Bonds; I = Combined Instruments; M = Others (Misc.)	X = Not Appl./Undefined	X = Not Appl./Undefined	Form: 1. B = Bearer; R = Registered; N = Bearer/Registered; M = Others (Misc.)
R = Entitlement (Rights)	P = Purchase Rights	Asset: S = Common/Ordinary Shares; P = Preferred/Preference Shares; C = Common/Ordinary Convertible Shares; F = Preferred/Preference Convertible Shares; B = Bonds; I = Combined Instruments; M = Others (Misc.)	X = Not Appl./Undefined	X = Not Appl./Undefined	Form: 1. B = Bearer; R = Registered; N = Bearer/Registered; M = Others (Misc.)
R = Entitlement (Rights)	W = Warrants	Underlying asset: B = Baskets; S = Equities; D = Debt Instruments/Interest Rates; T = Commodities; C = Currencies; I = Indices; M = Others (Misc.)	Type: T = Traditional Warrants; N = Naked Warrants; C = Covered Warrants	Call / Put: C = Call; P = Put; B = Call and Put	Exercise Option Style: A = American; E = European; B = Bermudan; M = Others (Misc.)
R = Entitlement (Rights)	F = Mini-future certificates/constant leverage certificates	Underlying asset: B = Baskets; S = Equities; D = Debt Instruments/Interest Rates; T = Commodities; C = Currencies; I = Indices; M = Others (Misc.)	Barrier dependency type: T = Barrier Underlying Based; N = Barrier Instrument Based; M = Others (Misc.)	Long / short: C = Long; P = Short; M = Others (Misc.)	Exercise Option Style: A = American; E = European; B = Bermudan; M = Others (Misc.)
R = Entitlement (Rights)	D = Depository receipts on entitlements	Instrument dependency: A = Allotment (Bonus) Rights; S = Subscription Rights; P = Purchase Rights; W = Warrants; M = Others (Misc.)	X = Not Appl./Undefined	X = Not Appl./Undefined	Form: B = Bearer; R = Registered; N = Bearer/Registered; M = Others (Misc.)
R = Entitlement (Rights)	M = Other (Misc.)	X = Not Appl./Undefined	X = Not Appl./Undefined	X = Not Appl./Undefined	X = Not Appl./Undefined
O = Listed Options	C = Call Options	Exercise option style: A = American; E = European; B = Bermudan	Underlying asset: B = Baskets; S = Stock-Equities; D = Debt Instruments; T = Commodities; C = Currencies; I = Indices; O = Options; F = Futures; W = Swaps; N = Interest Rates; M = Others (Misc.)	Delivery: P = Physical; C = Cash; N = Non-Deliverable; E = Elect at Exercise	Standard: S = Standardized; N = Non-Standardized
O = Listed Options	P = Put Options	Exercise option style: A = American; E = European; B = Bermudan	Underlying asset: B = Baskets; S = Stock-Equities; D = Debt Instruments; T = Commodities; C = Currencies; I = Indices; O = Options; F = Futures; W = Swaps; N = Interest Rates; M = Others (Misc.)	Delivery: P = Physical; C = Cash; N = Non-Deliverable; E = Elect at Exercise	Standard: S = Standardized; N = Non-Standardized
O = Listed Options	M = Others (Misc.)	X = Not Appl./Undefined	X = Not Appl./Undefined	X = Not Appl./Undefined	X = Not Appl./Undefined
F = Futures	F = Financial futures	Underlying Asset: 1. B = Baskets; 2. S = Stock-Equities; 3. D = Debt Instruments; 4. C = Currencies; 5. I = Indices; 6. O = Options; 7. F = Futures; 8. W = Swaps; 9. N = Interest Rates; 10. V = Stock Dividend; 11. M = Others (Misc.)	Delivery: P = Physical; C = Cash; N = Non-Deliverable	Standardized / Non-Standardized: S = Standardized; N = Non-Standardized	X = Not Appl./Undefined
F = Futures	C = Commodities futures	Underlying Asset: E = Extraction Resources; A = Agriculture; I = Industrial Products; S = Services; N = Environmental; P = Polypropylene Products; H = Generated Resources; M = Others (Misc.)	Delivery: P = Physical; C = Cash; N = Non-Deliverable	Standardized / Non-Standardized: S = Standardized; N = Non-Standardized	X = Not Appl./Undefined
S = Swaps	R = Rates				
S = Swaps	T = Commodities				
S = Swaps	E = Equity				
S = Swaps	C = Credit				
S = Swaps	F = Foreign exchange (FX)				
S = Swaps	M = Others (Misc.)				
H = Non-listed and complex listed options	R = Rates				
H = Non-listed and complex listed options	T = Commodities				
H = Non-listed and complex listed options	E = Equity				
H = Non-listed and complex listed options	C = Credit				
H = Non-listed and complex listed options	F = Foreign exchange (FX)				
H = Non-listed and complex listed options	M = Others (Misc.)				
I = Spots	F = Foreign exchange (FX)	X = Not Appl./Undefined	X = Not Appl./Undefined	X = Not Appl./Undefined	Delivery: P = Physical
I = Spots	T = Commodities	Underlying asset: A = Agriculture; J = Energy; K = Metals; N = Environmental; P = Polypropylene Products; S = Fertilizer; T = Paper; M = Others (Misc.)	X = Not Appl./Undefined	X = Not Appl./Undefined	X = Not Appl./Undefined
J = Forwards	E = Equity				
J = Forwards	F = Foreign exchange (FX)				
J = Forwards	C = Credit				
J = Forwards	R = Rates				
J = Forwards	T = Commodities				
K = Strategies	R = Rates				
K = Strategies	T = Commodities				
K = Strategies	E = Equity				
K = Strategies	C = Credit				
K = Strategies	F = Foreign exchange (FX)				
K = Strategies	Y = Mixed assets				
K = Strategies	M = Others (Misc.)				
L = Financing	L = Loan Lease	Underlying asset: A = Agriculture; B = Baskets; J = Energy; K = Metals; N = Environmental; P = Polypropylene Products; S = Fertilizer; T = Paper; M = Others (Misc.)	X = Not appl./Undefined	X = Not appl./Undefined	Delivery: P = Physical; C = Cash; N = Non-Deliverable
L = Financing	R = Repurchase agreements	Underlying asset: G = General collateral; S = Specific security collateral; C = Cash collateral	Termination: F = Flexible; N = Overnight; O = Open; T = Term	X = Not appl./Undefined	Delivery: D = Delivery versus payment; H = Hold-in-custody; T = Tri-party
L = Financing	S = Securities Lending	Underlying asset: C = Cash collateral; G = Govt. bonds; P = Corporate bonds; T = Convertible bonds; E = Equity; L = Letter of credit; D = Cert. of deposit; W = Warrants; K = Money Market instruments; M = Others (Misc.)	Termination: N = Overnight; O = Open; T = Term	X = Not appl./Undefined	Delivery: D = DvP / Delivery versus payment; F = Free of payment; H = Hold-in-custody; T = Tri-party
T = Referential instruments	C = Currencies	Type: N = National Currency; L = Legacy Currency; C = Bullion Coins; M = Others (Misc.)	X = Not appl./Undefined	X = Not appl./Undefined	X = Not appl./Undefined
T = Referential instruments	T = Commodities	Underlying asset: E = Extraction Resources; A = Agriculture; I = Industrial Products; S = Services; N = Environmental; P = Polypropylene Products; H = Generated Resources; M = Others (Misc.)	X = Not appl./Undefined	X = Not appl./Undefined	X = Not appl./Undefined
T = Referential instruments	R = Interest rates	Type: N = Nominal; V = Variable; F = Fixed; R = Real; M = Others (Misc.)	Freq. of calculation: D = Daily; W = Weekly; N = Monthly; Q = Quarterly; S = Semi-Annually; A = Annually; M = Others (Misc.)	X = Not appl./Undefined	X = Not appl./Undefined
T = Referential instruments	I = Indices	Asset class: E = Equities; D = Debt; F = Collective Investment Vehicles; R = Real Estate; T = Commodities; C = Currencies; M = Others (Misc.)	Weighting type: P = Price Weighted; C = Capitalization Weighted; E = Equal Weighted; F = Modified Market Capitalization Weighted; M = Others (Misc.)	Index return type: P = Price Return; N = Net Total Return; G = Gross Total Return; M = Others (Misc.)	X = Not appl./Undefined
T = Referential instruments	B = Baskets	Composition: E = Equities; D = Debt; F = Collective Investment Vehicles; I = Indices; T = Commodities; C = Currencies; M = Others (Misc.)	X = Not appl./Undefined	X = Not appl./Undefined	X = Not appl./Undefined
T = Referential instruments	D = Stock dividends	Type of equity: S = Common Ordinary Shares; P = Preferred/Preference Shares; C = Common Ordinary Convertible Shares; F = Preferred/Preference Convertible Shares; L = Limited Partnership Units; K = Collective Investment Vehicles; M = Others (Misc.)	X = Not appl./Undefined	X = Not appl./Undefined	X = Not appl./Undefined
T = Referential instruments	M = Misc. / Others	X = Not appl./Undefined	X = Not appl./Undefined	X = Not appl./Undefined	X = Not appl./Undefined
M = Misc. / Others	C = Combined instruments	Component: S = Combination of Shares; B = Combination of Bonds; H = Share and Bond; A = Share and Warrant; W = Warrant and Warrant; U = Fund Units and Other Components; M = Others (Misc.)	Ownership: T = Restrictions; U = Free	X = Not appl./Undefined	Form: B = Bearer; R = Registered; N = Bearer/Registered; M = Others (Misc.)
M = Misc. / Others	M = Misc. / Others	Further grouping: R = Real Estate Deeds; I = Insurance Policies; E = Escrow Receipts; T = Trade Finance Instruments; N = Carbon Credit; P = Precious Metal Receipts; S = Other OTC Derivative Products; M = Others (Misc.)	X = Not appl./Undefined	X = Not appl./Undefined	X = Not appl./Undefined

== See also ==
- Central Index Key – Identifier issued by the US SEC
- CUSIP – Code identifying a North American financial security
- ISO 6166 (ISIN) – Identifier for a security
- ISO 10383 – Standardized identifier of financial markets
- ISO 20022 – Standard for electronic data interchange between financial institutions
- National Securities Identifying Number (NSIN) – Code identifying a financial instrument
- FIX Protocol newsletter describing the options and futures CFI codes
