= Wertpapierkennnummer =

German securities identification code

The Wertpapierkennnummer (WKN, WPKN, WPK or Wert) is a German securities identification code. It is composed of six digits or capital letters (excluding I and O), and no check digit.

== Changes in format ==
There have been several changes in the WKN definition:

- WKN were switched from numeric to alphanumeric on 21 July 2003
- The first 2–4 Letters may show the issuer of the Instrument.
- Until March 2000, the WKNs were divided into different number ranges that represented different types of securities (e.g., stocks, warrants, funds, etc.).

The WKNs and DE-ISINs are provided by WM Datenservice.

WKNs may be obsolete in future, since they may be replaced by International Securities Identification Numbers (ISINs).

== Spelling and meaning ==
Like most very long German words, Wertpapierkennnummer is a compound word: Wert-Papier-Kenn-Nummer, if translated literally, means value-paper-identification-number (Wertpapier = financial security; Kennnummer = identification number).

Before the German spelling reform of 1996 the correct spelling was Wertpapierkennummer with only two consecutive n's, since the orthography rules allowed the same consonant three times in a row only under special circumstances. Since the reform, the spelling has been Wertpapierkennnummer with three consecutive n’s.

== See also ==
- CUSIP
- ISIN
- SEDOL
