= Request for quote =

A Request for Quote (RfQ) is a financial term for a certain way to ask a bank for an offer of a given financial instrument from a bank, made available by so-called Approved Publication Arrangement (APA) by the stock markets itself or by Financial data vendors as required in Europe by MiFID II and in effect since January 2018. A RFQ contains at least the ISIN to uniquely identify the financial product, the type (buy/ sell), the amount, a currency, and the volume ($\hbox{amount}\times\hbox{market price}$ in given currency).

== In finance ==
a financial term for certain way to ask a bank for an offer of a given financial instrument from a bank, made available by so-called Approved Publication Arrangement (APA) by the stock markets itself or by Financial data vendors as required in Europe by MiFID II and in effect since January 2018. A RFQ contains at least the ISIN to uniquely identify the financial product, the type (buy/ sell), the amount, a currency, and the volume ($\hbox{amount}\times\hbox{market price}$ in given currency).

=== Background ===
In the wake of the 2007-09 financial crisis there was an initiative to create more pre-trade transparency, for which it is essential to know who is requesting which financial product.

Article 1(2) of the Commission Delegated Regulation (EU) 2017/583 of 14 July 2016 (which supplements Regulation (EU) No 600/2014 of the European Parliament and of the council on markets in financial instruments) defines:

A request-for-quote (RfQ) system is a trading system where the following conditions are met:

1. a quote or quotes by a member or participant are provided in response to a request for a quote submitted by one or more other members or participants;
2. the quote is executable exclusively by the requesting member or participant;
3. the requesting member or market participant may conclude a transaction by accepting the quote or quotes provided to it on request.

This essentially means, that everybody buying or selling stocks, bonds, foreign exchange, commodities or exchange-traded funds (ETFs) will (automatically) generate a RfQ before the trade is settled.
