= Euroclear Nederland =

Financial market infrastructure

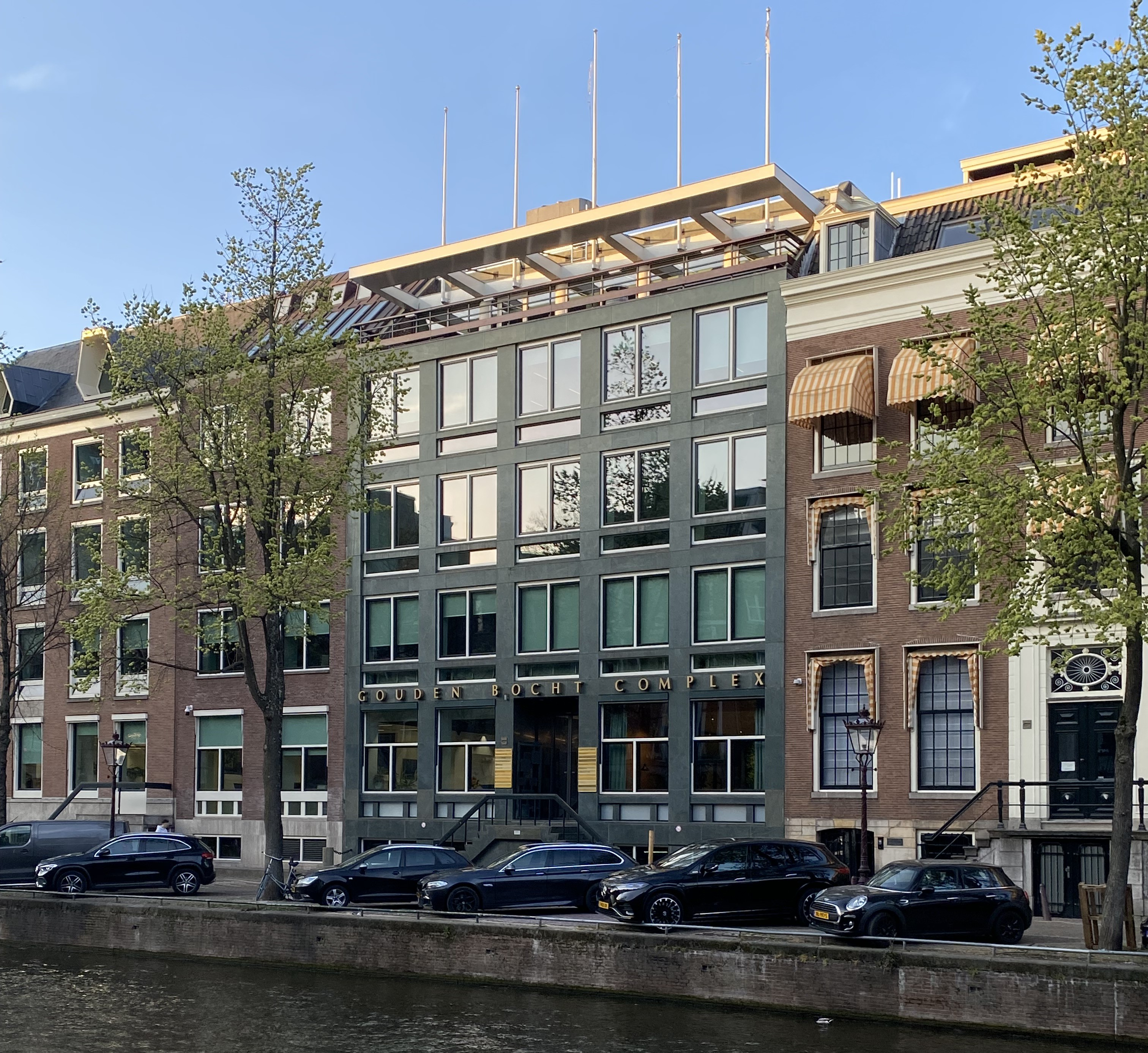
Gouden Bocht Complex building on Herengracht 459-469 in Amsterdam, head office of Necigef then of Euroclear Nederland

Euroclear Nederland is the main central securities depository (CSD) in the Netherlands. It is a fully owned subsidiary of the Euroclear Group.

== Overview ==
The Nederlands Centraal Instituut voor Giraal Effectenverkeer (Necigef, lit. 'Dutch central securities depository') started operations in September 1977, with nearly all Dutch physical securities deposited there. In the early 1990s, its safe on the Herengracht in Amsterdam held over eight million paper documents with aggregate value above 800 billion euros. Necigef was fully owned by Amsterdam Exchanges, known as AEX.

In 2000, AEX merged with its Belgian and French counterparts to form Euronext. On 5 September 2000, Euroclear announced intent to acquire Necigef. The transaction was completed in two stages in February and April 2002. Following the acquisition, Necigef adopted Euroclear Nederland as its commercial name.

In January 2009, the Euroclear-owned CSDs in Belgium and the Netherlands migrated to a technical platform known as the Euroclear Settlement of Euronext-zone Securities (ESES), which had been launched in November 2007 in France. Since then, ESES has been operated by Euroclear as a single platform, even though the relevant contracts and legal arrangements remain differentiated for the three countries.

In 2016, Euroclear Nederland connected to TARGET2-Securities (T2S), the Eurosystem's securities settlement service. On that occasion, Euroclear France was appointed investor CSD within ESES. As part of that process, on 18 March 2016, all eligible foreign securities from Euroclear Nederland and Euroclear Belgium were transferred to Euroclear France as the CSD of reference. In September 2016, the connection of the three ESES CSDs was successfully completed.

== See also ==
- Sicovam code
- Euroclear Belgium
- Euroclear France
- European Central Securities Depositories Association
