= Sicovam code =

The SICOVAM code or simply "SICOVAM" was a security identifier system used to identify French securities listed on French stock exchanges. SICOVAM stands for the Société Interprofessionnelle pour la Compensation des Valeurs Mobilières (lit. 'inter-industry securities clearing company'), the French central securities depository later known as Euroclear France, which assigned the codes. SICOVAM codes stopped being assigned on July 1, 2003, when they were replaced with ISINs.

== Description ==
SICOVAM codes consisted of a six-digit identifier, assigned by the SICOVAM company "by hand" in order of issue. For instance, Alcatel was assigned 013000.

SICOVAM codes could be directly converted to ISINs as with other older systems, including CUSIP and SEDOL. To do so the number was padded out with three zeros on the front, then the country code "FR" was added to the front and the ISIN check digit to the end.
