= SIX Financial Information =

Financial data vendor

- Industry: Financial services
- Founded: 1930; 96 years ago (as Ticker AG)
- Headquarters: Zurich, Switzerland,
- Key people: Marion Leslie (Head Financial Information); Bjørn Sibbern (CEO SIX Group); Dr. Thomas Wellauer (chairman SIX Group)
- Products: Reference data & pricing; Market data & display; Tax & regulatory services; Indices
- Services: Financial data
- Revenue: CHF 418 500 000 (2024)
- Owner: SIX Group
- Number of employees: 1,166
- Website: www.six-financial-information.com

SIX Financial Information, a subsidiary of SIX Group, is a multinational financial data vendor headquartered in Zurich, Switzerland. The company provides market data which it gathers from the world's major trading venues directly and in real-time or which it also sources on its own. Its database has structured and encoded securities administration data for more than 20 million financial instruments. The firm has offices in 23 countries.

== History ==
In 1930, Ticker AG was founded in Zurich, Switzerland by a group of Swiss banks. In 1961, it launched the first stock market television service in Switzerland, and was renamed Telekurs Financial. In 1975, Telekurs launched Investdata, the first financial information display in Switzerland.

Telekurs began to expand outside of Switzerland in 1990. In 1996, the firm was restructured into a holding company, and launched an expansion of its product range. In 2007, Telekurs acquired part of the Fininfo Group. In 2008, The Telekurs Group merged with SWX Group, SIS Swiss Financial Services Group and SEGA Intersettle to form SIX Group. Telekurs Financial was renamed to SIX Telekurs and became the Financial Information division of SIX Group.

On 23 April 2012, the "Telekurs" name was discontinued and the company is now known as SIX Financial Information.

== Products and services ==
The SIX Financial Information products flow from the same single logical database, and are divided into the following categories:

=== Reference data and pricing ===
SIX Financial Information's main product, the Valordata Feed (VDF), is a source for reference and descriptive data plus corporate actions. Based on a unique data model, VDF holds information on approximately 20 million financial instruments, drawing on over 1500 trading venues and contributors. For calculated and evaluated prices, SIX Financial Information offers a number of specific products within this category.

=== Market data ===
SIX Financial Information's market data products are real-time or delayed. The master database allows customers to link nearly 1,500 individual data elements across millions of active financial instruments, for a clear view of investment positions. Services range from valuation pricing and real-time market data feeds to streamlined back-office products and all are used for improved straight-through processing.

=== Regulatory compliance ===
For regulatory compliance, SIX Financial Information provides information that helps analyze exposures and aggregate positions for reporting. SIX Financial Information has incorporated flags, markers and classifications into VDF that facilitate compliance with taxation regulations such as the EU savings tax, Swiss transaction taxes, IRS Section 871(m) and US IRS Withholding, plus fee calculation regulations such as the SEC rule 22c-2, pan-European rules such as the Markets in Financial Instruments Directive, the Packaged Retail and Insurance-based Investment Products Regulation and UCITS III and IV and global economic sanctions.

=== Display products ===
The SIX Financial Information display products provide access to the company's full range of data. These products offer access to quotes, lists, charts, news, corporate fundamental data. SIX Financial Information also bundles its display products with fee-liable data such as news, company fundamentals and ratings.

=== Indices ===
Financial Information provides index services by calculating indices and offering licenses for SIX indices. Among the most prominent indices are the Swiss blue chip index SMI, the IBEX 35 as benchmark for the Spanish Equity market as well as a series of indices representing the Nordic Equity markets. The business generates subscription as well as asset based revenues. Subscription fees for the index services are generally invoiced quarterly for variable fees and annually for fixed fees.

== Company compliance and standards ==
SIX Financial Information actively participates with global standards organizations to define and adopt relevant standards that promote straight-through processing.

Specifically, SIX Financial Information is the official national numbering agency (NNA) in Switzerland, Liechtenstein and Belgium, and in this capacity is responsible for the issuing of Valoren and ISIN identifiers. The company is also a founding member of ANNA, as well as a co-operator of the ANNA Service Bureau.

SIX Financial Information is a member of the International Organization for Standardization (ISO), FISD, and Markets in Financial Instruments Directive joint working groups, and is a SWIFT certified distributor of ISO 15022 corporate actions messages.
