= Non-alphanumeric typeface =

Typefaces which contain pictures or symbols rather than letters and numbers are called non-alphanumeric typefaces. Important subclasses are dingbats, ornamental and pictorial typefaces
