= Central Securities Clearing System =

Central Securities Clearing System (CSCS) Plc.
- Formation: April 14, 1997
- Location: Nigeria
- Key people: Shehu Yahaya Shantali (CEO)

Central Securities Clearing System Plc. (CSCS) is a Nigerian financial market infrastructure responsible for the depository, clearing, settlement and delivery and reporting of all securities transactions in the Nigerian capital market. CSCS provides a single access point for all post-trade services, including equities, treasury bills, bonds, commodities, funds, and cash.

== History ==
CSCS started operating in on April 14, 1997. In 2023, CSCS announced that they earned 7.284 billion naira from transaction and depository fees. CSCS was awarded Capital Market Infrastructure Developer of the Year at Business Day Banks and other Financial Institutions (BAFI) Awards in 2024.
