= Euroclear France =

Financial market infrastructure

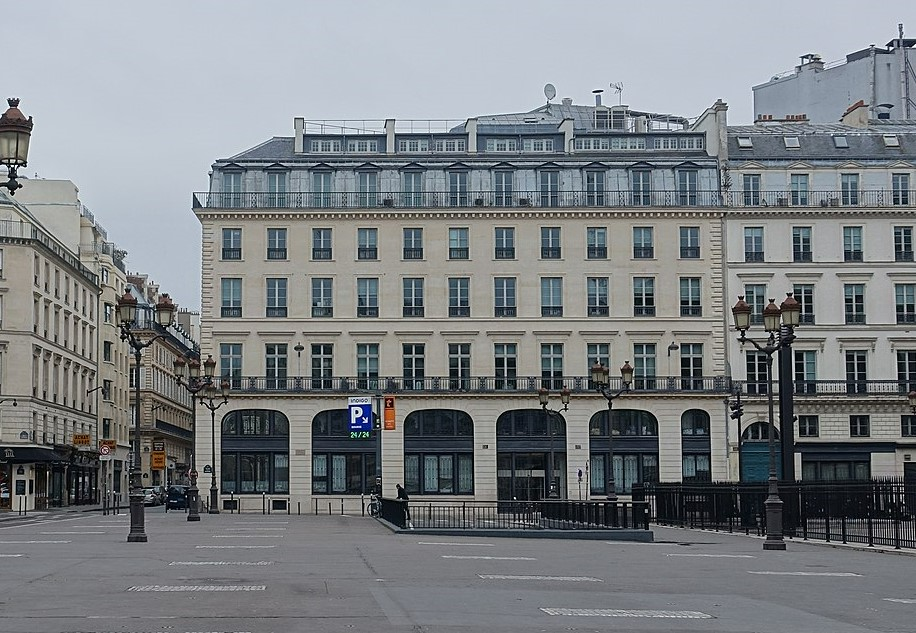
Building at 10–12, place de la Bourse in Paris, seat of Euroclear France

Euroclear France is the main central securities depository (CSD) in France. It is a fully owned subsidiary of the Euroclear Group.

== Overview ==
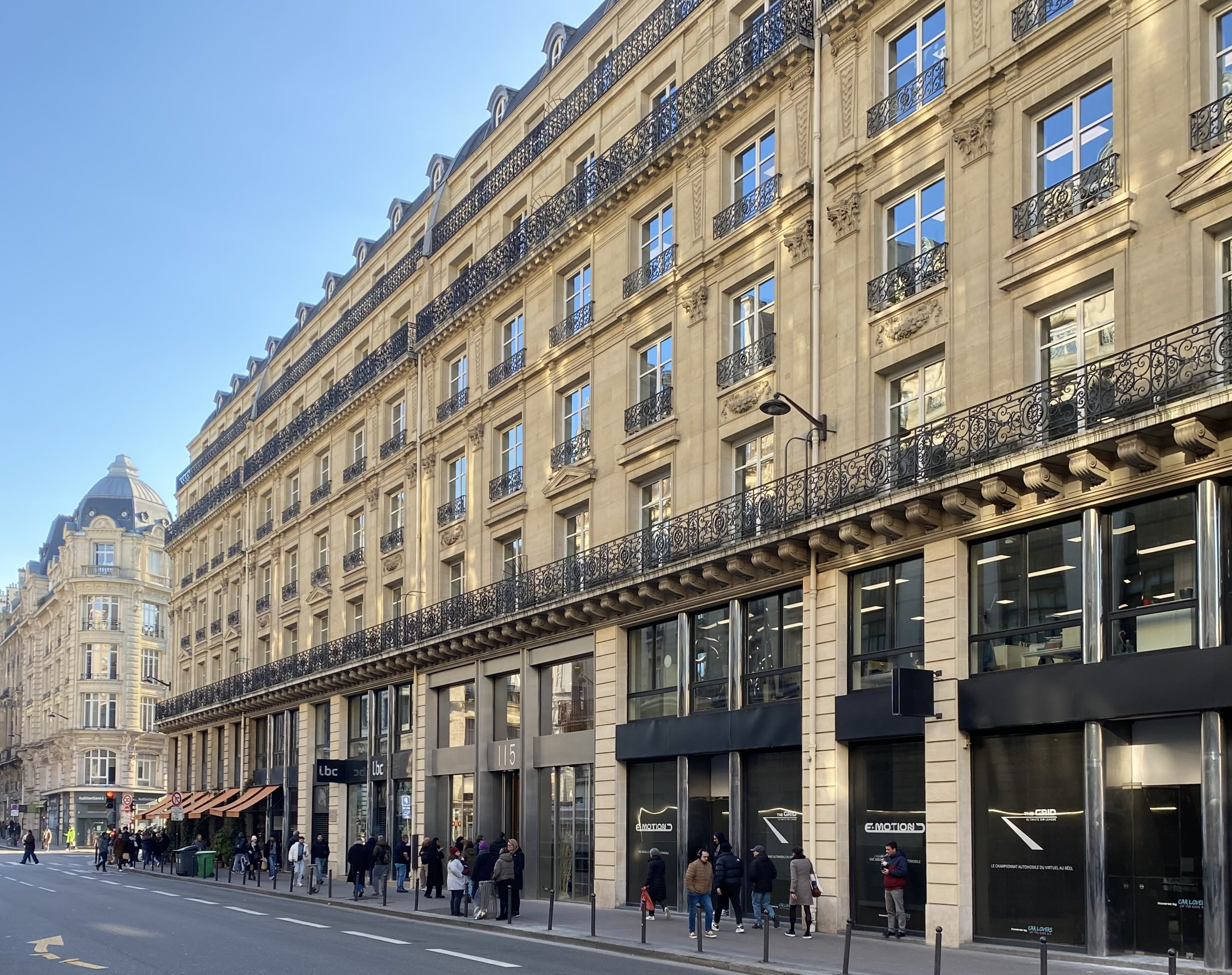
Building at 115, rue Réaumur in Paris, former head office of SICOVAM in the late 1990s

In 1941, the Vichy regime created the Caisse Centrale des Dépôts et Virements de Titres (CCDVT, lit. 'central securities deposit and transfer institution') with the intent of being able to track the ownership of French equities in the context of German occupation of France. Its inspiration was the Kassenverein system which had successfully operated in Germany for several decades. Deposit of shares at the CCDVT was made mandatory by subsequent Vichy legislation of 3 February 1943.

In the postwar period following the liberation of France, the deposit mandate was deemed harmful to civil liberties and lifted by legislation of 5 July 1949 and executive order of 4 August 1949 which established a replacement entity to the CCDVT, named the Société Interprofessionnelle de COmpensation des VAleurs Mobilières (lit. 'inter-industry securities clearing company'), abbreviated as SICOVAM. In practice, the vast majority of securities holders kept their securities deposited at SICOVAM even though that was no longer mandatory. The SICOVAM was owned by multiple French brokers, banks and other financial institutions, and operated as a semi-public organization under close oversight from the French Finance Ministry.

By the early 1990s, the Société des Bourses Françaises (SBF) held a small equity stake in SICOVAM. In 1993 Jean-François Théodore, who had led the SBF since 1990, also became chairman of SICOVM and worked at consolidating French financial market infrastructures. In January 1995, SICOVAM took over the securities settlement system previously operated by the Bank of France; as a consequence, the latter took a 40 percent stake in SICOVAM. In 1997, a holding company named Soparsico was formed to gather shares in SICOVAM, and subsequently changed its name to Sicovam Holding. Soparsico purchased the Bank of France's 40 percent stake in SICOVAM as well as those of the SBF (5.36 percent), Caisse des Dépôts et Consignations (4.92 percent), and others.

From its founding, SICOVAM was headquartered at 52–60 Champs-Élysées, in the building of the First National City Bank. In 1987, it moved to Noisy-le-Grand in the outer suburbs of Paris, then in 1996 back to central Paris at 115, rue Réaumur.

On 20 March 2000, SBF agreed to merge with its Belgian and Dutch counterparts to form Euronext. Four days latter, an agreement of principle was made for Euroclear to acquire SICOVAM. That transaction was completed on 10 January 2001. As a consequence, Sicovam Holding became a significant shareholder of the Euroclear parent company, with a 16.67 percent equity stake. Following the acquisition, Sicovam adopted Euroclear France as its commercial name.

In November 2007, Euroclear France migrated to a technical platform known as the Euroclear Settlement of Euronext-zone Securities (ESES), which in January 2009 was joined by the Euroclear-owned CSDs in Belgium and the Netherlands. Since then, ESES has been operated by Euroclear as a single platform, even though the relevant contracts and legal arrangements remain differentiated for the three countries.

In 2016, Euroclear France connected to TARGET2-Securities (T2S), the Eurosystem's securities settlement service. On that occasion, Euroclear France was appointed investor CSD within ESES. As part of that process, on 18 March 2016, all eligible foreign securities from Euroclear Nederland and Euroclear Belgium were transferred to Euroclear France as CSD of reference. In September 2016, the connection of the three ESES CSDs to T2S was successfully completed.

== See also ==
- Sicovam code
- Euroclear Belgium
- Euroclear Nederland
- European Central Securities Depositories Association
