= Central Index Key =

Identifier issued by the US SEC

A Central Index Key or CIK number is a unique number assigned to an individual, company, filing agent or foreign government by the United States Securities and Exchange Commission. The number is used to identify its filings in several online databases, including EDGAR.

The numbers are up to ten digits in length and are permanent identifiers that may not be changed.

Entities and individuals such as Section 16 filers apply for a CIK on Form ID (notarized).

== See also ==
- CUSIP
- ISO 6166 (International Securities Identification Number - ISIN)
- Legal Entity Identifier
- Ticker symbol
- Unique Entity Identifier
