= Private market assets =

Private market assets refer to investments in equity (shares) and/or debt issued by private companies, as opposed to publicly listed companies. These markets include private equity, venture capital, real estate, infrastructure, farmland, and forestry. The CFA Institute describes private markets and alternative investments, spanning private equity, private credit, real estate, infrastructure, commodities, and hedge funds, as one of the faster-growing segments of the finance industry.

== Private Market Assets Matrix (PMAM) ==
Private Market Assets Matrix: Infrastructure vs. Overall Non-Listed

The Private Market Assets Matrix (PMAM), also called Infrastructure and Private Markets Investment Matrix, is an original strategic assessment tool developed by M. Nicolas Firzli, World Pensions Council and Joshua Franzel, MissionSquare Research Institute, International City/County Management Association. The matrix maps out the evolution of "institutional investment by visualizing dynamically the proportion of assets allocated to infrastructure (Y axis) and private-market assets overall (X axis) for a cross-section of pension funds perceived as highly representative" [of future trends]. Pension fund infrastructure allocations grew from an average of 2.4 percent of assets in 2007 to 4.1 percent in 2018, a trend broadly consistent with the shift the PMAM was designed to visualize. Insurer Aviva said in 2025 it was doubling private markets exposure in its default pension portfolios, to 20–25 percent of holdings.
