= SEDOL =

List of security identifiers

SEDOL stands for Stock Exchange Daily Official List, a list of security identifiers used in the United Kingdom and Ireland for clearing purposes. The numbers are assigned by the London Stock Exchange, on request by the security issuer. SEDOLs serve as the National Securities Identifying Number for all securities issued in the United Kingdom and are therefore part of the security's International Securities Identification Number (ISIN) as well. The SEDOL Masterfile (SMF) provides reference data on millions of global multi-asset securities each uniquely identified at the market level using a universal SEDOL code.

== Description ==
SEDOLs are seven characters in length, consisting of two parts: a six-place alphanumeric code and a trailing check digit. SEDOLs issued prior to January 26, 2004 were composed only of numbers. For older SEDOLs, those from Asia and Africa typically begin with 6. Those from the UK and Ireland (until Ireland joined the EU) typically begin with 0 or 3. Those from the rest of Europe typically began with 4, 5, or 7. Those from the Americas began with 2.

After January 26, 2004, SEDOLs were changed to be alpha-numeric and are issued sequentially, beginning with B000009. At each character position numbers precede letters and vowels are never used. All new SEDOLs, therefore, begin with a letter. Ranges beginning with 9 are reserved for end user allocation.

The check digit for a SEDOL is chosen to make the total weighted sum of all seven characters a multiple of 10. The check digit is computed using a weighted sum of the first six characters. Letters have the value of 9 plus their alphabet position, such that B = 11 and Z = 35. While vowels are never used in SEDOLs, they are not ignored when computing this weighted sum (e.g. H = 17 and J = 19, even though I is not used), simplifying code to compute this sum. The resulting string of numbers is then multiplied by the weighting factor as follows:

 +  First   1 
 +  Second  3 
 +  Third   1 
 +  Fourth  7 
 +  Fifth   3 
 +  Sixth   9 
 +  Seventh 1 (the check digit)

The character values are multiplied by the weights. The check digit is chosen to make the total sum, including the check digit, a multiple of 10, which can be calculated from the weighted sum of the first six characters as (10−(weighted sum modulo 10)) modulo 10.

For British securities, SEDOLs are converted to ISINs by padding the front with two zeros, then adding the country code on the front and the ISIN check digit at the end.

JavaScript code for validating SEDOLs Code:

Modified from http://rosettacode.org/wiki/SEDOLs

function checkSedol(text) {
	var weight = [1, 3, 1, 7, 3, 9, 1];
	try {
		var input = text.substr(0, 6);
		var check_digit = sedol_check_digit(input);
		return text == input + check_digit;
	} catch(e) {
		return false;
	}       
	return false;
    
	function sedol_check_digit(char6) {
	    if (char6.search(/^[0-9BCDFGHJKLMNPQRSTVWXYZ]{6}$/) == -1) {
	        throw "Invalid SEDOL number '" + char6 + "'";
	    }
	    var sum = 0;
	    for (var i = 0; i < char6.length; i++){
	        sum += weight[i] * parseInt(char6.charAt(i), 36);
	    }
	    var check = (10 - sum%10) % 10;
	    return check.toString();
	}
}

=== Example ===
BAE Systems: 0263494

The checksum can be calculated by multiplying the first six digits by their weightings:

(0×1, 2×3, 6×1, 3×7, 4×3, 9×9) = (0, 6, 6, 21, 12, 81)

Then summing up the results:

0 + 6 + 6 + 21 + 12 + 81 = 126

The check digit is then calculated by:

[10 − (126 modulo 10)] modulo 10 = (10 − 6) modulo 10 = 4 modulo 10 = 4
