= Crédit Anversois =

Former Belgian bank

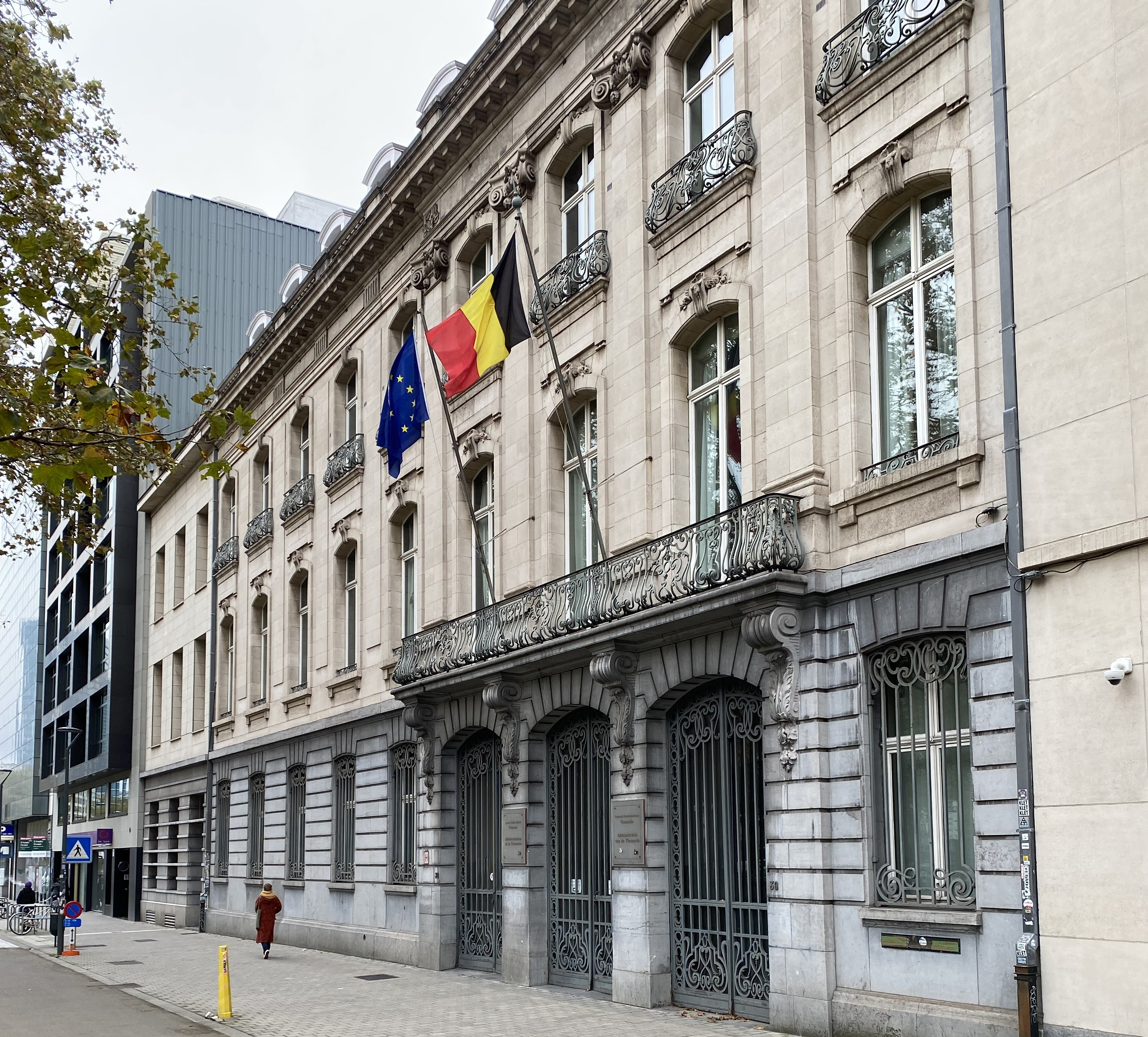
Building at Avenue des Arts / Kunstlaan 30, former main Brussels branch of the Crédit Anversois; lately offices of Federal Public Service Finance

The Crédit Anversois (lit. 'Credit [bank] of Antwerp') was a Belgian bank, founded in 1898 and liquidated in 1939-1941. Just before World War I, it was the fourth-largest bank by total assets in Antwerp, itself Belgium's second banking center behind Brussels. By 1930, it had expanded so that it ranked fourth-largest in all of Belgium, only surpassed by the Société Générale de Belgique, Banque de Bruxelles, and Algemeene Bankvereeniging.

== Name ==
Even though the bank was primarily active in the Dutch-speaking part of Belgium, it was referred to by its French name including in Dutch-speaking or English-speaking contexts.

== History ==
The Crédit Anversois was founded in 1898 with support from France's Comptoir national d'escompte de Paris, then soon counted Germany's Darmstädter Bank and Nationalbank für Deutschland among its shareholders, joined in 1911 by the Crédit Mobilier Français. It initially engaged in industrial investment, but after losses in 1900-1901, pivoted instead towards commercial credit.

On the eve of the First World War, Banque du Crédit Anversois adopted a policy of expansion, establishing a presence throughout Wallonia and setting up provincial branches such as the one in Verviers, Liège.

Its head office was in Antwerp, at courte rue de l'Hôpital / Korte Gasthuisstraat 42, in a building designed by architect Jan De Vroey. It also erected buildings at Bondgenotenlaan 54 in Leuven, at 133 Crapaurue in Verviers (built 1913-1914, arch. Charles Thirion), and at 4 boulevard d'Avroy in Liège (in 1922).

In 1913, it took a major stake in the Bruges-based Brugse Bank, which was subsequently rebranded "Crédit des Flandres – filiale du Crédit Anversois". In 1919, it acquired three other local banks in Dutch-speaking Belgium, the Banque Brugeoise, the Crédit Tirlemontois, and the Crédit Limbourgeois.

The Crédit Anversois never recovered from the financial turmoil of the early 1930s. Following the 1934 Belgian legislation that mandated the separation of commercial and investment banking, its troubled equity investment portfolio was spun off in a holding company, the Société de Participations Financières et Industrielles or Sopafinin, on which the bank kept a large claim on which it delayed impairment for several years, with the blessing of the Belgian Banking Commission. The Belgian financial crisis of 1939 put an end to that period of forbearance, and the Crédit Anversois was allowed by a court in December 1939 to suspend payments pending restructuring, amid allegations of embezzlement. At the time, it had 1,500 employees and 138 branches. The liquidation, led by Eugène de Barsy, was completed in 1941 with financial help from the Office de Liquidation des Interventions de Crise, a temporary resolution agency that existed in Belgium between 1936 and 1942.

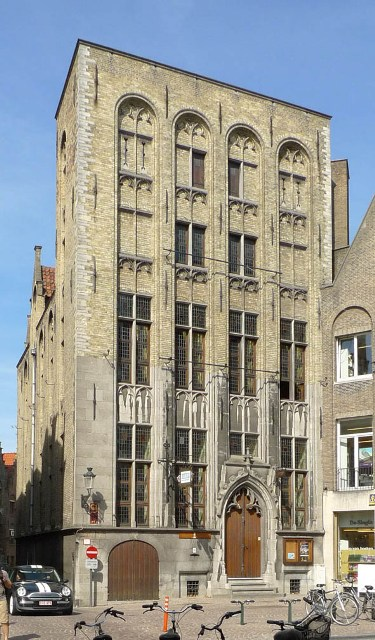
The iconic Beurs House in Bruges became a branch of the Crédit Anversois in the early 20th century

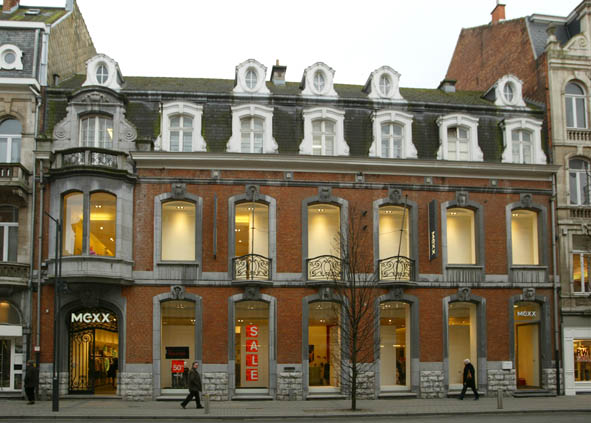
Former branch in Leuven

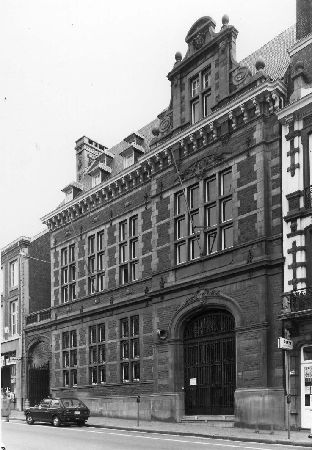
Former branch in Verviers, photographed in 1980

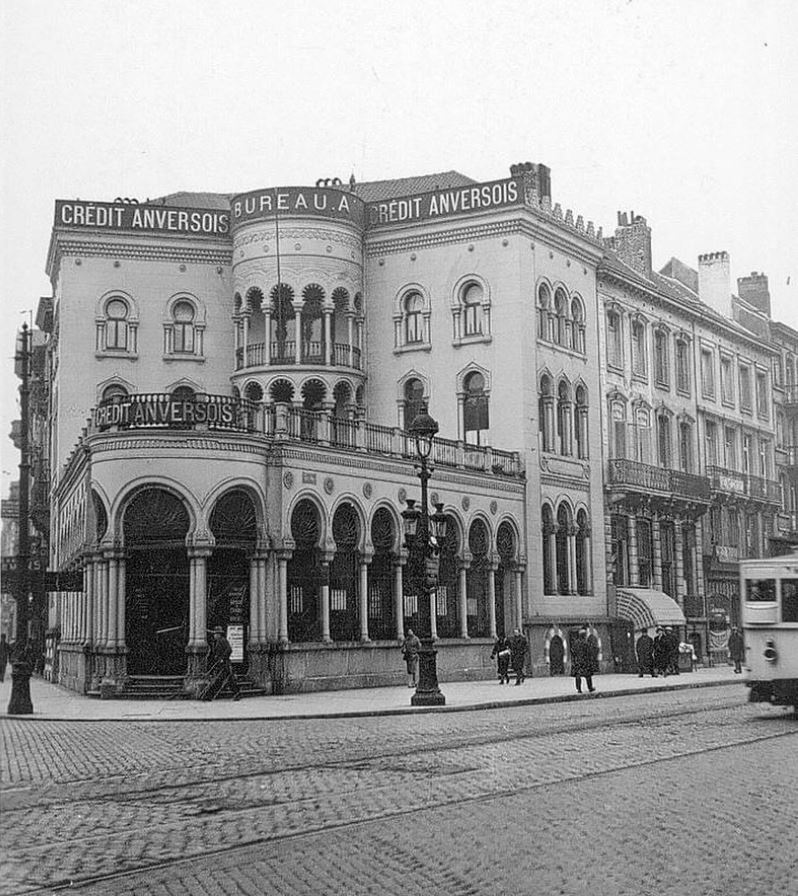
Branch in the former Hotel Terrasse in Brussels (later demolished)

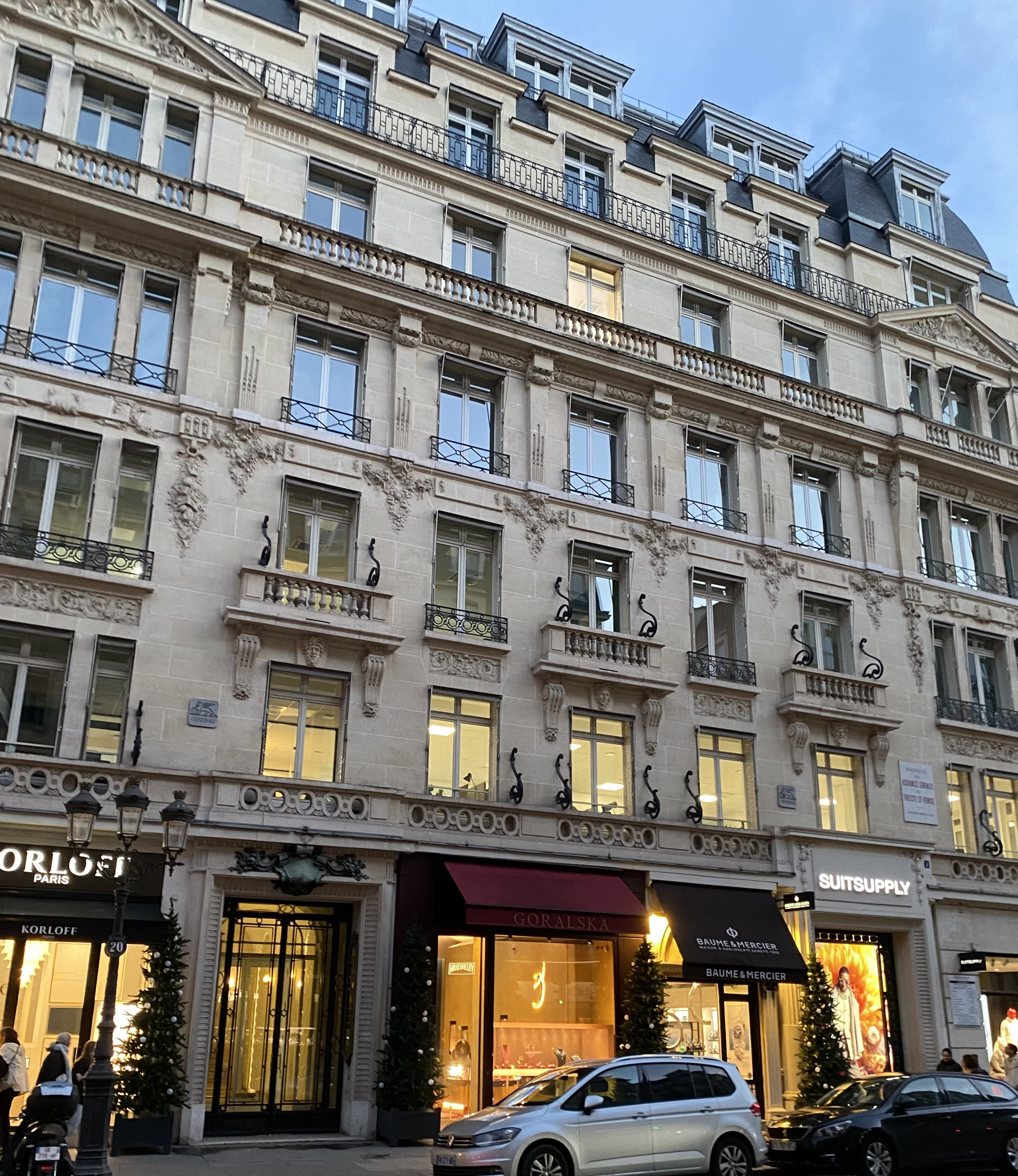
Former French subsidiary at 20 rue de la Paix, Paris

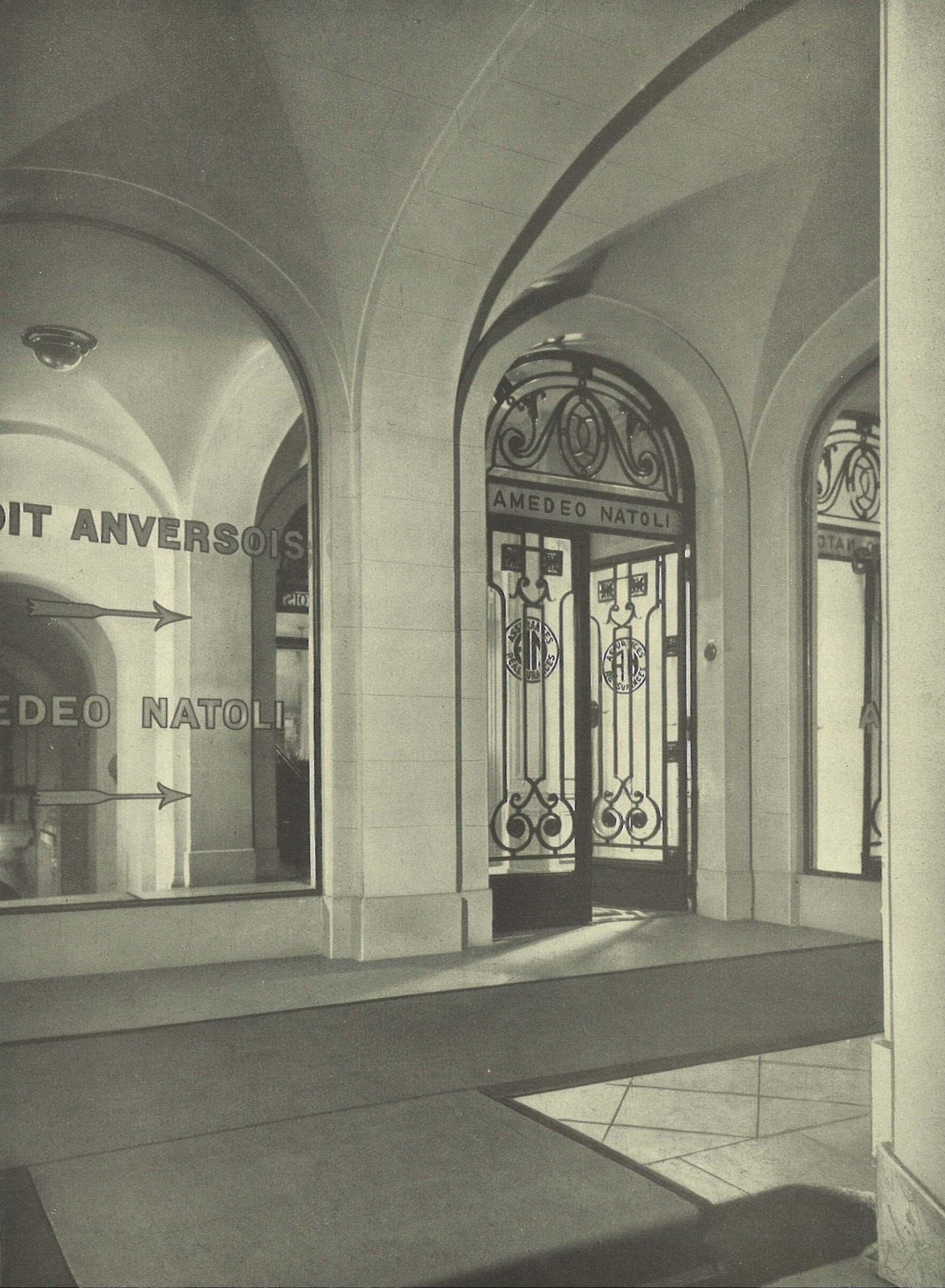
French subsidiary entrance hall, photographed in 1924

== Leadership ==
- Astère Vercruysse de Solart, chairman 1898-1913
- Josse Allard, chairman ca. 1921

Aviator Jean de Selys Longchamps worked for the Crédit Anversois before World War II.

== See also ==
- Banque Liégeoise
- Banque de Commerce
- Leon Van der Rest
- List of banks in Belgium
