= Banque de Commerce =

Former bank in Antwerp

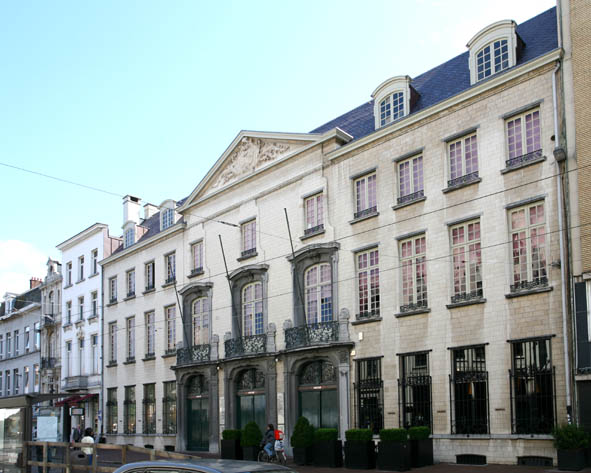
- Building on Lange Gasthuisstraat 9–11 in Antwerp, head office of the Banque de Commerce from 1907 to 1968; repurposed as a clothing store in 2002
- Formerly: Banque De Wolf, Chase Banque de Commerce S.A. / Chase Handelsbank N.V.
- Type: Private company
- Industry: Financial services
- Founded: 1780
- Founder: Charles Jean Michel De Wolf
- Defunct: 1989
- Fate: Acquired
- Successor: Crédit Lyonnais
- Headquarters: Antwerp, Belgium
- Products: Banking services, loans
- Parent: Bank Brussels Lambert

The Banque de Commerce (French pronunciation: [bɑ̃k də kɔmɛʁs]) was a medium-sized Belgian bank. It was founded in Antwerp in 1780 by Charles Jean Michel De Wolf and was known as the Banque De Wolf until 1893. Just before World War I, it was the sixth-largest bank by total assets in Antwerp, and before World War II, the second-largest.

From the aftermath of World War I, the Banque de Commerce then successively controlled by Barclays, Banque de Bruxelles, and Chase Manhattan Bank which in 1985 rebranded it Chase Banque de Commerce S.A. / Chase Handelsbank N.V., then eventually acquired in 1989 by France's Crédit Lyonnais.

== History ==
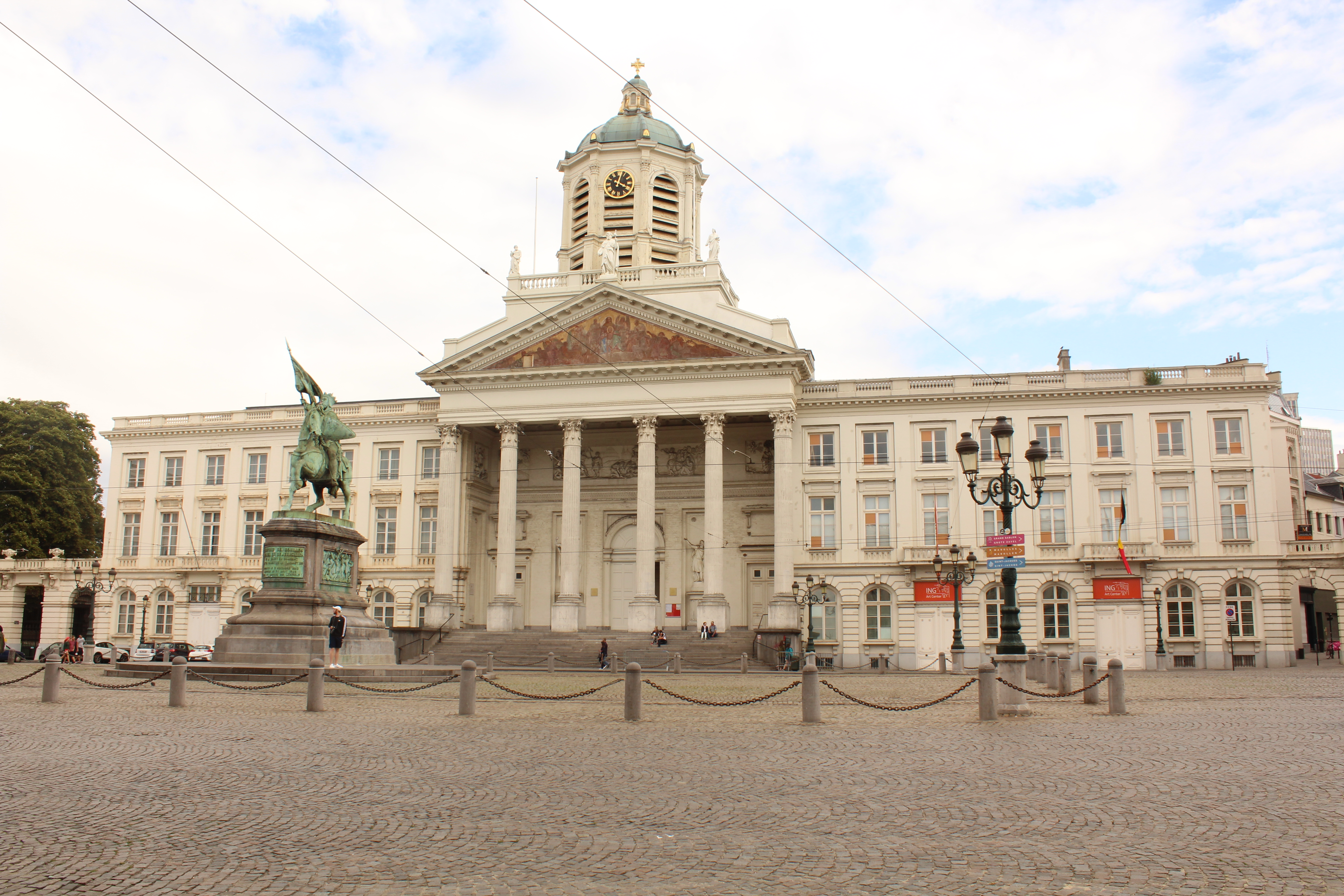
Building at Place Royale 6 (right), Banque de Commerce's Brussels branch from 1929 to 1968, later ING Art Center

In 1780, Charles Jean Michel De Wolf, who was born in 1747 from a middle-class Antwerp family, initiated a banking business. In 1791 he started lending to the fledgling U.S. federal government, whose early creditworthiness he helped to establish. After De Wolf's death in 1806, his banking business was run until 1861 by Pierre Joseph de Caters, who in 1810 had married De Wolf's young widow Jeanne Antoinette de Wolf-Ergo (1772-1857). In 1882, the private bank was transformed into a joint-stock bank, branded Banque C.J.M. de Wolf with reference to its founder. That same year, the bank had a new head office built on Maarschalk Gérardstraat 2 in Antwerp, designed by architect Edmond Leclef.

In 1893, Banque C.J.M. de Wolf was rebranded Banque de Commerce. Following World War I, Barclays acquired a controlling stake. In 1922–1926, the bank built a prominent head office building in Antwerp by expanding the former Hotel Vecquemans designed in the second quarter of the 18th century by Jan Pieter van Baurscheit the Younger on Lange Gasthuisstraat 9–11. It also opened branches in Brussels and Ostend. In 1929 its Brussels branch opened in the prestigious Hotel Coudenberg building at No. 6 Place Royale, after renovation on a design by architect Henry Lacoste.

In 1962, Barclays sold its controlling stake in Banque de Commerce to Banque de Bruxelles. in 1965–1966, Banque de Bruxelles sold half of the equity to Chase Manhattan Bank. As a result, Banque de Commerce became a joint venture which focused on serving subsidiaries of foreign multinationals operating in Belgium. Its head office was relocated from Antwerp to Brussels in 1968.

In 1978, Chase bought the remainder of shares of Banque de Commerce from Bank Brussels Lambert, and in 1985 rebranded it as Chase Banque de Commerce S.A. (in French) and Chase Handelsbank N.V. (in Dutch). In 1986, the bank acquired the Belgian retail operations of Manufacturers Hanover Corporation. In 1989, Chase sold it to Crédit Lyonnais which was in a phase of rapid expansion. Crédit Lyonnais' Belgian operations were in turn acquired in 1998 by Deutsche Bank.

== Name ==
Even though the bank was primarily active in the Dutch-speaking part of Belgium, for most of its existence it was generally referred to by its French name including in Dutch-speaking or English-speaking contexts. In the 1980s, as sensitivities about language had evolved in Belgium, Chase adopted a bilingual approach for its rebranding.

== See also ==
- Banque d'Anvers
- Crédit Anversois
- Antwerp Diamond Bank
- List of banks in Belgium
