= Lacoste (disambiguation) =

Lacoste is a French apparel company. Lacoste (or LaCoste) may also refer to:

- Lacoste (surname), a French surname

== Places ==
- Lacoste, Hérault, a commune of the Hérault département, in France
- Lacoste, Vaucluse, a commune and medieval village of the Vaucluse département, in France
- Château Grand-Puy-Lacoste, a winery in the Bordeaux region of France
- LaCoste, Texas, United States

== Castles ==
- Château de Lacoste, in Lacoste, Vaucluse, France
- Château de Lacoste (Lot), in Salviac, Lot, France
- Château de La Coste (Lot), in Grézels, Lot, France

== Other ==
- Lacoste & Battmann, a defunct French automobile manufacturer
- Lacoste (political faction), Emmerson Mnangagwa's faction in the ZANU-PF party, Zimbabwe
- Citroën Lacoste, a 2010 French concept car
