= Le Slip français =

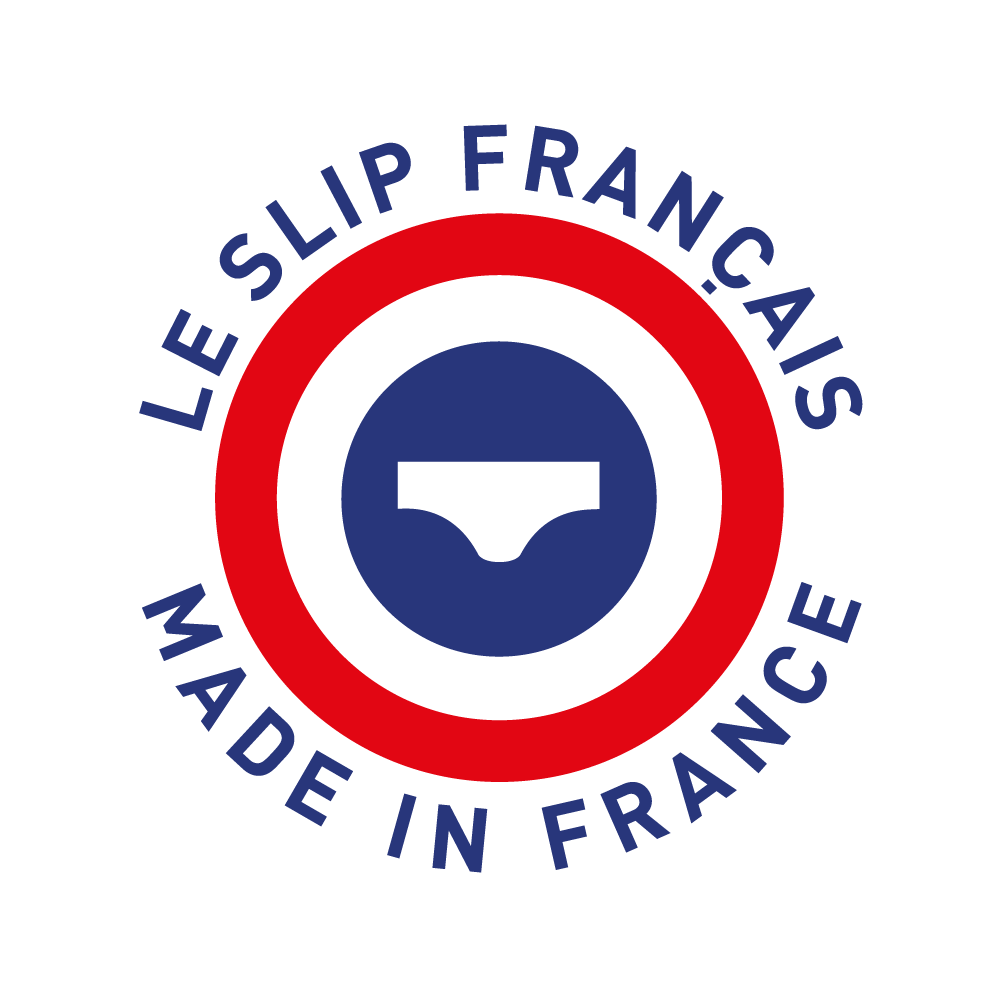
- Traded as: Euronext: ALLSF; Euronext Growth

Le Slip Français is a French company founded in 2011 that distributes underwear and accessories, primarily online. The brand bases its communication on the "made in France" trend, promoting the 100% French production of its products.

== History ==
On 24 October 2016, Experienced Capital announced that it had acquired a 36.5% stake in the company Le Slip Français.

In 2025, it inaugurated its factory near Paris.

In June 2026, the company was listed on the stock exchange. Also in 2026, the company posted a positive net result for the first time in its history in the first quarter of the year.

== Organization ==
It has its own factory in Aubervilliers, in the Seine-Saint-Denis department.
