= Lacoste (surname) =

Lacoste is a French surname. Notable people with the surname include:

- Alexandre Lacoste (1842–1923), Canadian politician
- Amélie Lacoste (born 1988), Canadian figure skater
- Carlos Lacoste (1929–2004), Argentine president
- Catherine Lacoste (born 1945), French golfer
- Henry Lacoste (1885–1968), Belgian architect and archaeologist
- Jean-Pascal Lacoste, French singer, actor and TV host
- Jean de Lacoste (1730–1820), lawyer in the parliament of Bordeaux
- Jean-Baptiste Lacoste (died 1821), French lawyer
- Jean Lacoste, French-German philosopher
- Jean-Yves Lacoste, French postmodern theologian
- Louis Lacoste (1798–1878), Canadian politician
- Louis Lacoste (composer) (c. 1675 – c. 1750), French composer
- Lucien LaCoste (1908–1995), American physicist
- Paul Lacoste (academic) (1923–2009), Canadian lawyer and academic administrator
- Paul V. Lacoste (born 1974), linebacker in the Canadian Football League
- René Lacoste (1904–1996), French tennis player and founder of the apparel company Lacoste
- Robert Lacoste (1898–1989), French politician
- Yves Lacoste (1929–2026), French geographer and geopolitician

== See also ==
- Lacoste
- Lacoste (disambiguation)
