= HydrogenPro =

- Type: Green hydrogen technology suppliers
- Founded: 2013; 13 years ago
- Headquarters: Norway
- Website: hydrogen-pro.com

HydrogenPro is a technology company and an OEM for high-pressure alkaline electrolyser systems for large-scale green hydrogen plants.

HydrogenPro was founded in 2013 by individuals with a background in the electrolysis industry. It was established in Telemark, Norway by Norsk Hydro in 1927.

== History ==
HydrogenPro was founded in 2013 by a team with the experienced electrolyser industry at Norsk Hydro and delivered the largest electrolyser plant in Northern Europe.

In 2020, HydrogenPro was listed on Euronext Growth with key investors such as Mitsubishi taking part in the IPO. HydrogenPro set up a joint venture with electrolyser producer THM and control over all IP and electrolyser technology.

In 2022, HydrogenPro secured a landmark purchase order for 10-year service and support agreement from Mitsubishi (220 MW in Utah, US). In the same year, they were listed on the main list of Oslo Børs.

In 2023, HydrogenPro entered into a partnership with ANDRITZ to collaborate on scaling up the manufacturing and assembly of electrolysers.
