= Euronext Clearing =

Financial market infrastructure

Euronext Clearing, known until 2023 as Cassa di Compensazione e Garanzia (CC&G), is the central counterparty clearing house (CCP) of the Euronext group of financial market infrastructures. CC&G was rebranded as Euronext Clearing in April 2023. Euronext Clearing is headquartered in Rome.

== History ==
Cassa di Compensazione e Garanzia S.p.A. was established in March 1992.

Euronext acquired CC&G together with the rest of the Borsa Italiana Group from London Stock Exchange Group in April 2021. On 9 November 2021, Euronext announced that it would expand CC&G into Euronext Clearing and made it the preferred CCP for all its markets in equities, listed derivatives and commodities.

== See also ==
- Euronext Securities
- Central counterparty clearing
