= Jean-François Théodore =

French businessman and economist

- Born: 5 December 1946; Paris, France
- Died: 18 May 2015 (aged 68); Paris, France
- Education: Sciences Po, ÉNA
- Occupations: President, chairman and CEO Euronext N.V., Deputy CEO NYSE Euronext
- Known for: orchestrating the first pan-European Exchange, spearheading creation of the first trans-Atlantic Exchange
- Spouse: Claudine (m. 1976)
- Children: 3

Jean-François Théodore (5 December 1946 – 18 May 2015) was a French businessman, President, chairman and CEO of Euronext N.V., deputy CEO and Head of Strategy of NYSE Euronext Inc. for Euronext N.V and chairman of its Managing Board.

== Early life and education ==
Jean-François Théodore was born in Paris, to civil servants, on 5 December 1946. He attended Institut d'Etudes Politiques de Paris, the prestigious Ecole Nationale D'Administration (ENA) and received his law degree (LLB) from Université de Paris.

== Career ==
He began his career at the Treasury Department in the Ministry of Economy and Finance, where he worked from 1974 to 1989. During this time he held multiple posts: Head of the Office of African States and the franc zone from 1980 to 1982, the Office of foreign investments in France and French overseas investments between 1982 and 1984, deputy director of Credit Institutions from 1984 to 1986 and deputy director, Head of the Finance and Holdings Department from 1986 to 1990, which included working alongside Jean-Claude Trichet on large privatization campaigns.

In 1990 Théodore became the chairman and CEO of Société des Bourses Françaises (SBF), the main French Cash financial market at the time. He led the SBF to transform and modernize, moving its trading to an electronic platform. During his tenure in SBF he continued his active participation in the affairs of the European finance and Stock exchanges. Between 1993 and 1994 he was the president of International Federation of Stock Exchanges (FIBV) and from 1998 to 2000 he served as the president of the Federation of European Stock Exchanges.

Following the move to Euro, Théodore saw that consolidation was the future of the financial markets. Through his efforts, in 1999, various French Markets (MATIF, MONEP, New Market) merged into a single company Paris Stock Exchange (Paris Bourse SA).

His next efforts were concentrated on forming a new pan-European exchange and moving the European financial market to a more modernized structure. In 2000 this resulted in creation of Euronext with a merger of the former Paris, Brussels, and Amsterdam national exchanges. At the time of its creation it was estimated that the stocks listed on Euronext markets had the combined value of $2.2 trillion, which, at the time was almost twice that of the Deutsche Borse in Frankfurt, at $1.4 trillion. It became Europe's second-largest stock exchange by market capitalization. In 2001 Théodore led Euronext to become a listed company, and in 2002 under his leadership, Euronext beat out LSE to purchase London's Liffe derivatives exchange, at the time the second largest derivatives market in Europe. The same year it added Lisbon Stock Exchange to its group, and became the first pan-European exchange, present in 5 countries.

Consolidation in Europe was followed by efforts in formation of the first trans-Atlantic securities market with NYSE, which became known as NYSE Euronext. This was announced in 2006 and came to fruition in 2007.

In 2009 he retired from his post at Euronext, but continued to guide the exchange through strategic mergers and acquisitions.

His colleagues, financial market specialists and press noted that his efforts and achievements were not so much for personal financial gain, but for reaching the goals of his vision for the company and the markets. In part, the success and speed of achievements were attributed to his modest approach, absence of arrogance and strength of conviction. He was described as having a Gallic sang-froid as well as charm, being prudent, patient and paying a great deal of attention to details.

== Awards ==
INSEAD Transcultural Leadership Award (24 April 2007)

== Personal life ==
Théodore was married to Claudine, a dermatologist, since 1976. They have three children. In September 2014 he was diagnosed with a brain tumor, and died on 18 May 2015.
