= Bourse at Bruges =

Bourse

- Huis ter Beurze

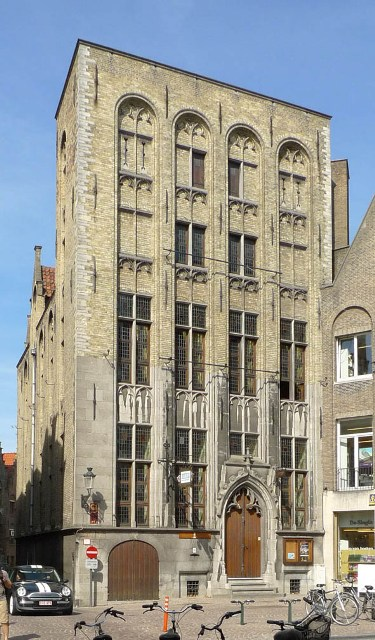
- Type: Commodity exchange
- Location: Bruges, Belgium
- Coordinates: 51°12′40.13″N 3°13′26.87″E
- Founded: 1285

The bourse at Bruges (Latin: bursa Brugensis, Dutch: Huis ter Beurze) was established in Bruges (in today's Belgium) in the 13th century. The term bourse is commonly said to derive from the Van der Beurze family and their inn, Huis ter Beurze.

== History ==
=== Inception ===
The exchange was owned by Van der Beurze family. Traders and foreign merchants from across Europe, especially the Italian Republics of Genoa, Florence and Venice, conducted business at this venue in the late medieval period. The building, which was established by Robert van der Beurze as a hostelry, had operated from 1285.

=== Decline ===
In the 16th century, Antwerp took over the role of trade center from Bruges. The Bourse of Antwerp was first opened in 1531 as the world's first purpose-built commodity exchange.

=== Changes to the building ===
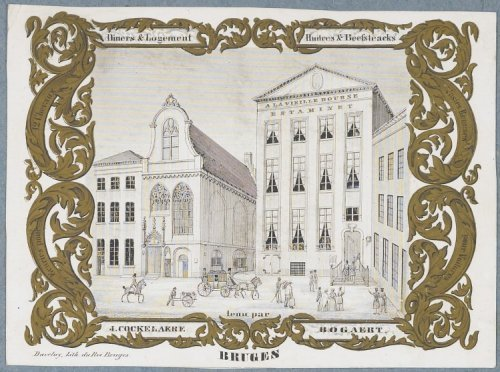
1845 appearance

During the 18th century, the façade of the Huis ter Beurze was rebuilt with a wide frontage of pilasters. However, in 1947 it was restored to its original medieval appearance.

== Etymology, family coat of arms ==
The exchange managers became famous for offering judicious financial advice to the traders and merchants who frequented the building. This service became known as the "Beurze Purse" which is the basis of bourse, meaning an organized place of exchange. Eventually, the building became solely a place for trading in commodities.

The coat of arms of the van der Beurze family depicts three purses (Flemish: buerzen, Greek: birsa, Latin: bursa) and thereby gave both the family its name and gave rise to the word 'bourse' (Note: The term bourse is derived from (Ancient Greek: βύρσα, romanized: bursa, lit. '"the skin stripped off a hide"') which was later used as bursa in Medieval Latin to refer to the "purse".).

== See also ==
- Bourse at Antwerp
- Brussels Stock Exchange
- Amsterdam Stock Exchange
- Euronext
- Exchange (organized market)
