= Fish Pool =

Fish Pool ASA
- Type: Commodity exchange
- Location: Bergen, Norway
- Founded: 2006
- Owner: Oslo Børs (97%)
- Key people: Søren Martens (CEO); Bente Avnung Landsnes (chairman)
- Currency: NOK
- Commodities: Atlantic Salmon
- Indices: Fish Pool Index
- Website: fishpool.eu

Fish Pool is an international commodity exchange located in Bergen, Norway that trades salmon futures contracts. The exchange is 97% owned by the stock exchange in Norway Oslo Børs, which in 2019 became part of Euronext. Established in 2006, it has grown to become the world's leading marketplace for the buying and selling of financial salmon contracts. The volumes traded at the exchange represent approximately 10-15% of the annual production of farmed Atlantic salmon in Norway.

It is under the supervision of the Norwegian Financial Supervisory Authority.

The primary objective of the exchange is to facilitate risk management of salmon spot price risk. Salmon farmers (sellers of farmed salmon) and processors (buyers of salmon) are examples of entities that use futures contracts for risk management of salmon spot price risk.

The Fish Pool market caters to a variety of participants, including salmon producers, processors, traders, exporters, and importers. By offering a transparent, liquid, and regulated marketplace, the exchange helps stabilize the salmon market, ensuring a more predictable and secure environment for all parties involved.

== Fish Pool Index ==
The Fish Pool Index is the corresponding index that is issued each week on the price of salmon. The index is a synthetic market price for fresh atlantic salmon and quoted in NOK per kilogram.

== Academic studies on Fish Pool derivatives ==
The spot-futures prices relationship on Fish Pool

Hedging efficiency of Fish Pool futures contracts

Is there a risk premium on Fish Pool futures contracts?
