= Stock Exchange, Antwerp =

Financial exchange

Stock Exchange, Antwerp or Handelsbeurs
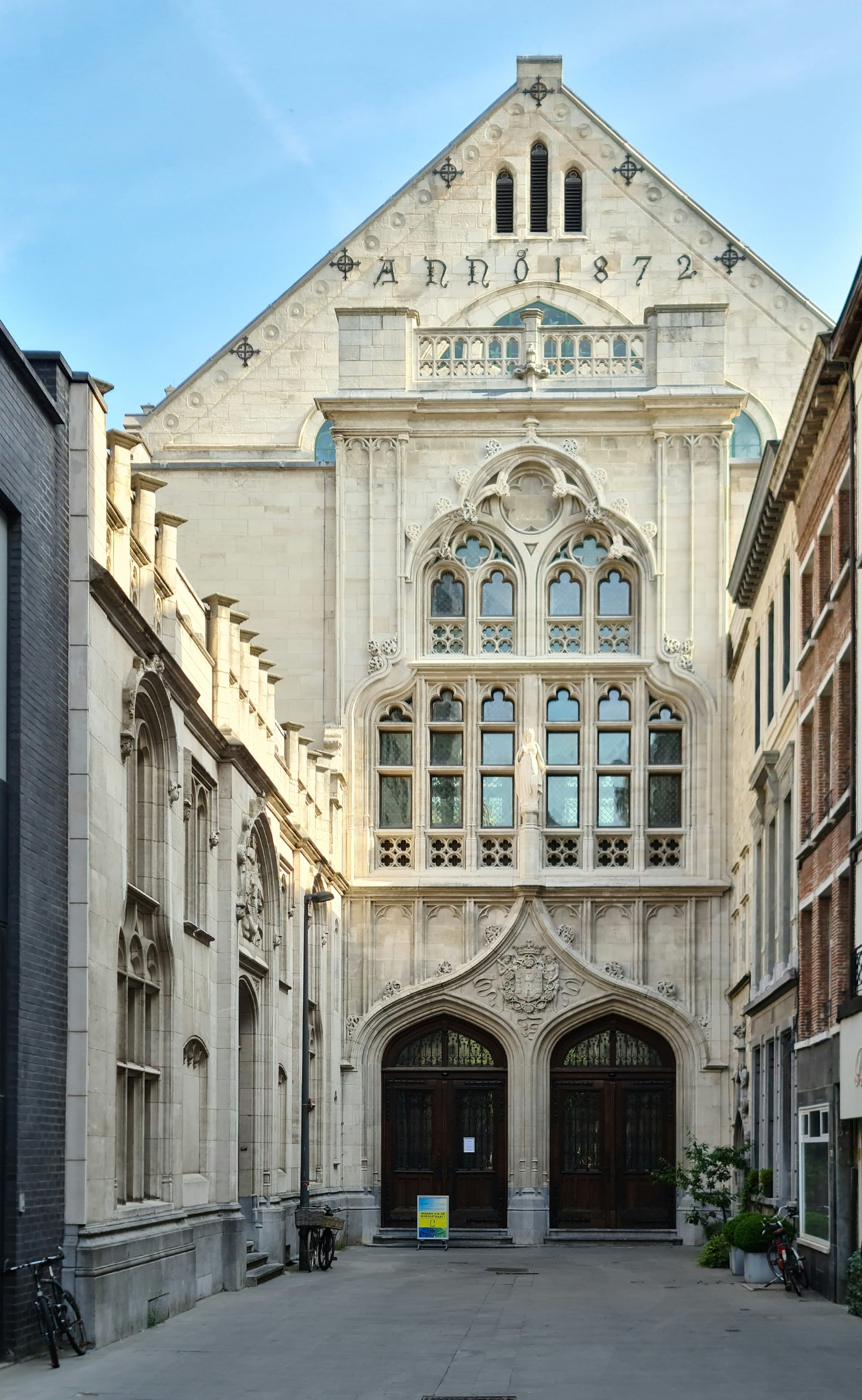
- Recent view of the exterior of the building
- Type: Commodity, stock exchange
- Location: Antwerp, Belgium
- Coordinates: 51.219306°N 4.406111°E
- Founded: 1531 (as a commodity exchange); 1872 (as a stock exchange)
- Closed: 1661 (when the commodity exchange fell into disuse); 1997 (when the stock exchange merged into Brussels Stock Exchange, presently Euronext)

The Stock Exchange, Antwerp or Handelsbeurs (in Dutch) is a building in Antwerp, Belgium, which opened in 1531 as the world's first purpose-built commodity exchange. The architectural design of the Royal Exchange in London was inspired by the Flemish style of the Antwerp Stock Exchange building. The Stock Exchange has been described as "the mother of all stock exchanges".

The commodity exchange fell into disuse in the 17th century, as following the Fall of Antwerp (1584–1585), Amsterdam had replaced Antwerp as the main trading centre in the Low Countries.

Following a fire in 1858, the building was reconstructed, and from 1872 once again served the purpose of housing a true stock exchange, the Antwerp Stock Exchange. In 1997 this stock exchange merged into the Brussels Stock Exchange (presently Euronext), and the building was once more abandoned and neglected. Following extensive restoration, the building is now part of a multipurpose events venue known as the Antwerp Trade Fair.

== History ==
=== 1531–1661: Commodity exchange ===
Favourable conditions led to trade in Antwerp flourishing in the 16th century on an unprecedented level. As Antwerp took over from Bruges the role of prime trade center in the Burgundian Netherlands, it grew into a large metropolis with more than 100,000 inhabitants, including 10,000 foreign merchants, mostly Spaniards and Portuguese. It developed at the same time into an important financial centre in Europe. All these financial transactions necessitated the construction of an appropriate infrastructure. In 1485, Antwerp wholesalers had obtained permission from the city magistrate to establish a "gemeyne borze" (common exchange). This building soon proved inadequate and as early as 1526–1527, plans were drawn up for a newer and more spacious seat. The new Exchange ('nieuwe beurs') was built in 1531 to replace the old exchange. The new exchange was located in the Twaalfmaandenstraat, a small side street off the Meir, the main commercial street in Antwerp.

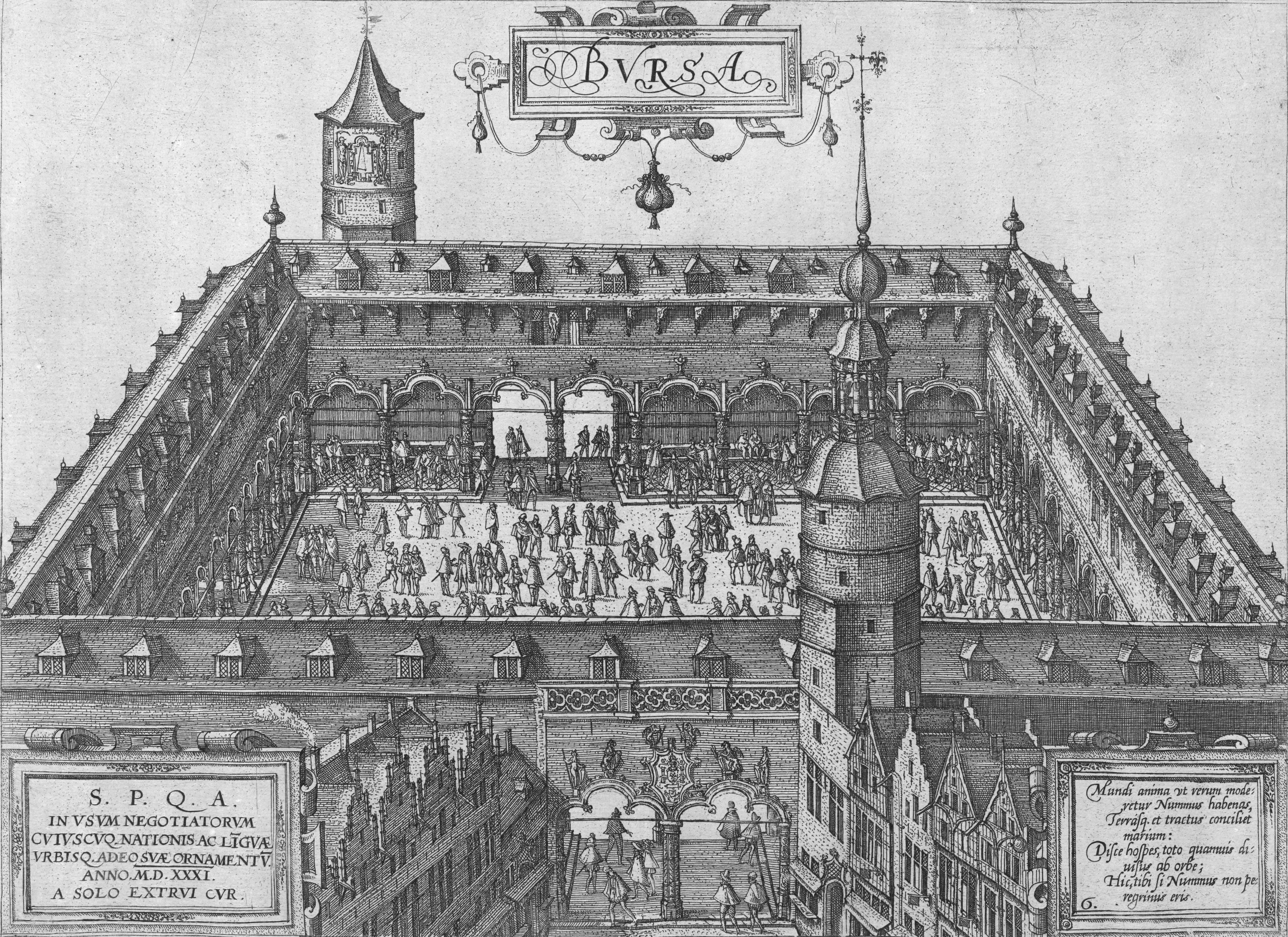
The building upon completion (1531)

The new exchange's building was conceived as a rectangular square with galleries covered on four sides, built on top of a street intersection. For half a century this exchange would be the focal point of European trade and the model for cities with similar ambitions. From 1531 to 1661, it was the site of the world's first specialised commodity exchange. The motto of the exchange was "in usum negotiatorum cuiuscumque nationis et linguae" (for the convenience of traders of any nationality and language).

The first building was built in the late Brabantine Gothic style in 1531 after a design by Domien de Waghemakere. A rectangular open space was enclosed by a colonnade covered with star and net vaults. The gallery concept of this building served as a model for London's Royal Exchange (designed by Hendrik van Paesschen), as well as for Rotterdam, Amsterdam and Lille. The high-rise 'pagoda towers' with octagonal and cylindrical hull may have served as a lookout for the harbor. Every nation had a more or less permanent location at the exchange.

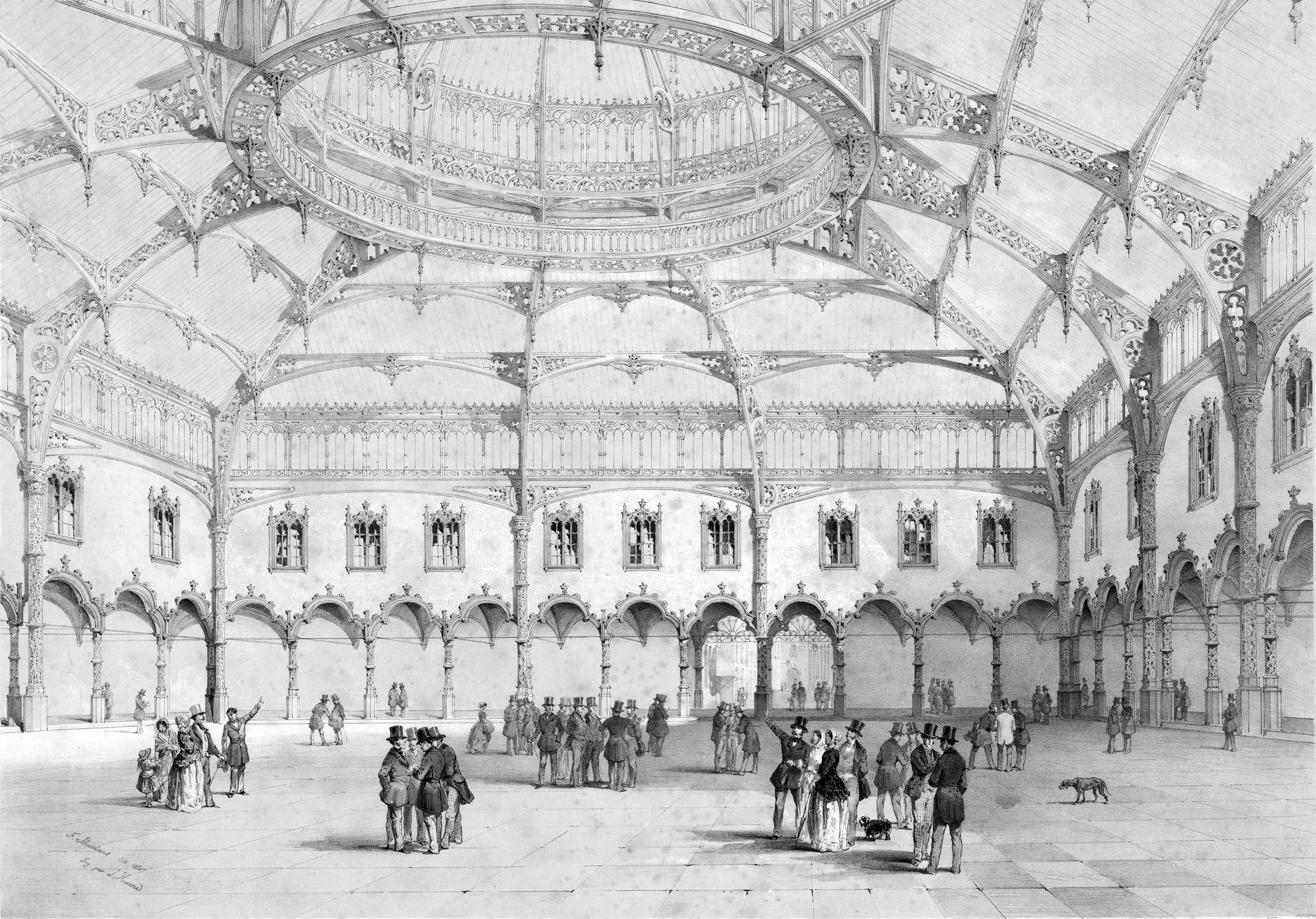
The glass dome erected over the central court yard in 1853 (1856)

After a fire in 1583, the Stock Exchange building was immediately rebuilt to the same plan. Due to the Siege of Antwerp (1584–1585) Antwerp lost its leading position in trade in the Low Countries to Amsterdam.

Thomas Gresham, the representative of the English crown in Antwerp, initiated the establishment in London in 1565 of an exchange designed after the Antwerp model. It was initially called the "Bourse" until Queen Elizabeth I, after a visit to the building on 23 January 1570, ordered its name changed to the Royal Exchange. The Middelburg stock exchange was opened in 1592, then Rotterdam in 1595 and Amsterdam in 1611.

=== 1661–1858: Disuse, various uses ===
Between 1661 and 1810 the building was used, among other things, as a drawing academy and seat of the Guild of Saint Luke. The open interior space was domed in 1853 by Charles Marcellis, following the example of London's Crystal Palace.

=== 1858–1997: Second fire, reconstruction as a stock exchange ===
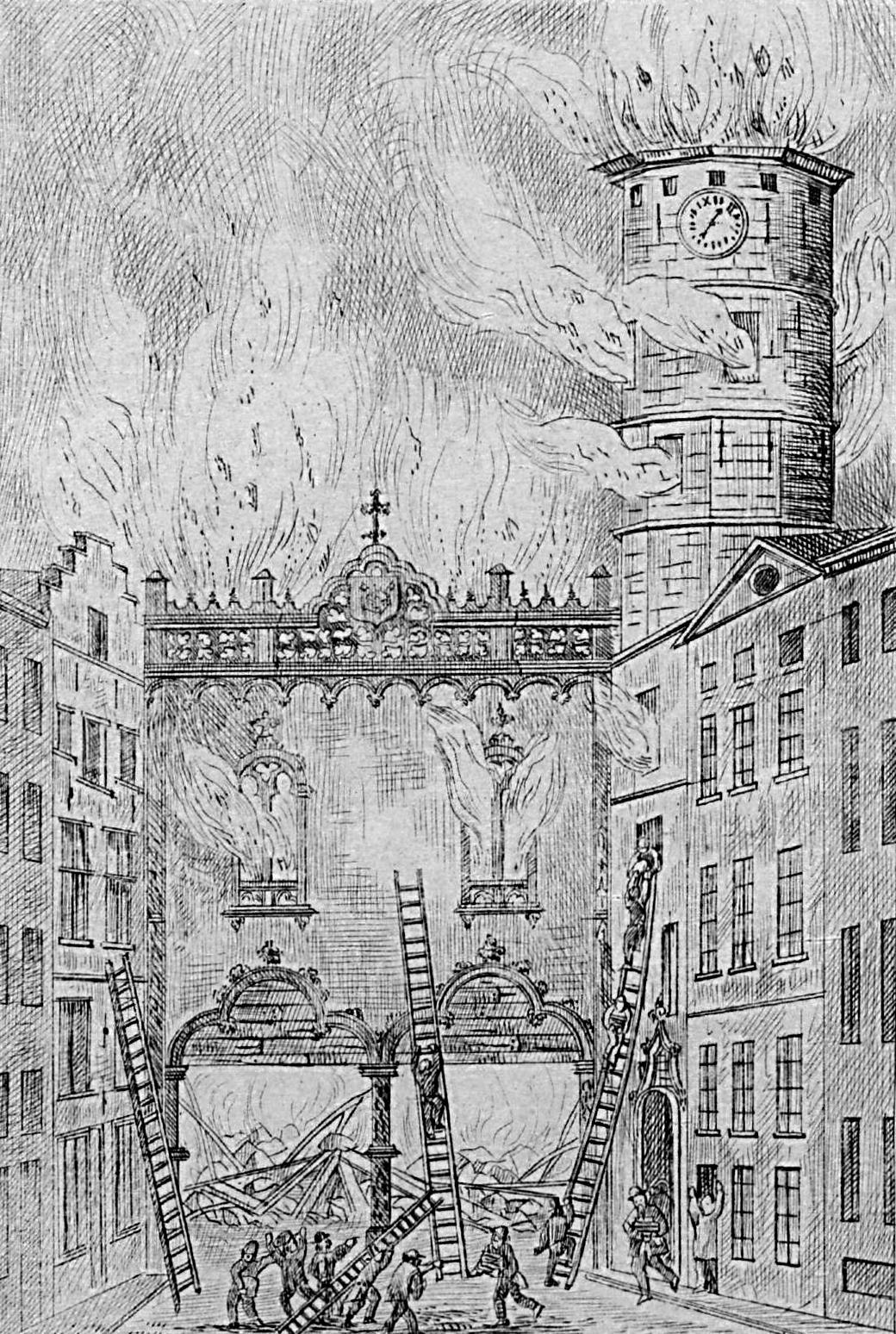
The second fire (1858)

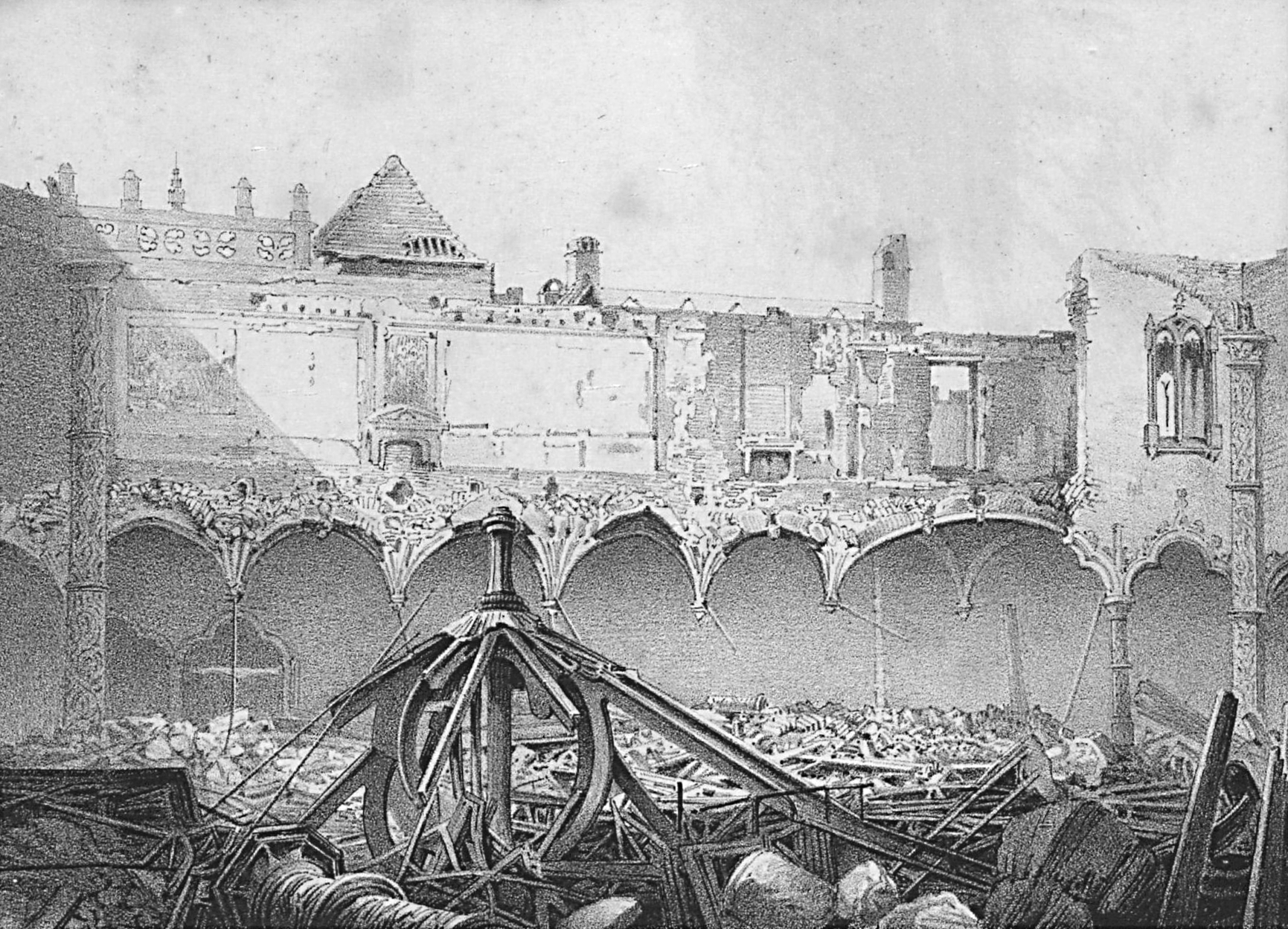
Devastation after the 1858 fire

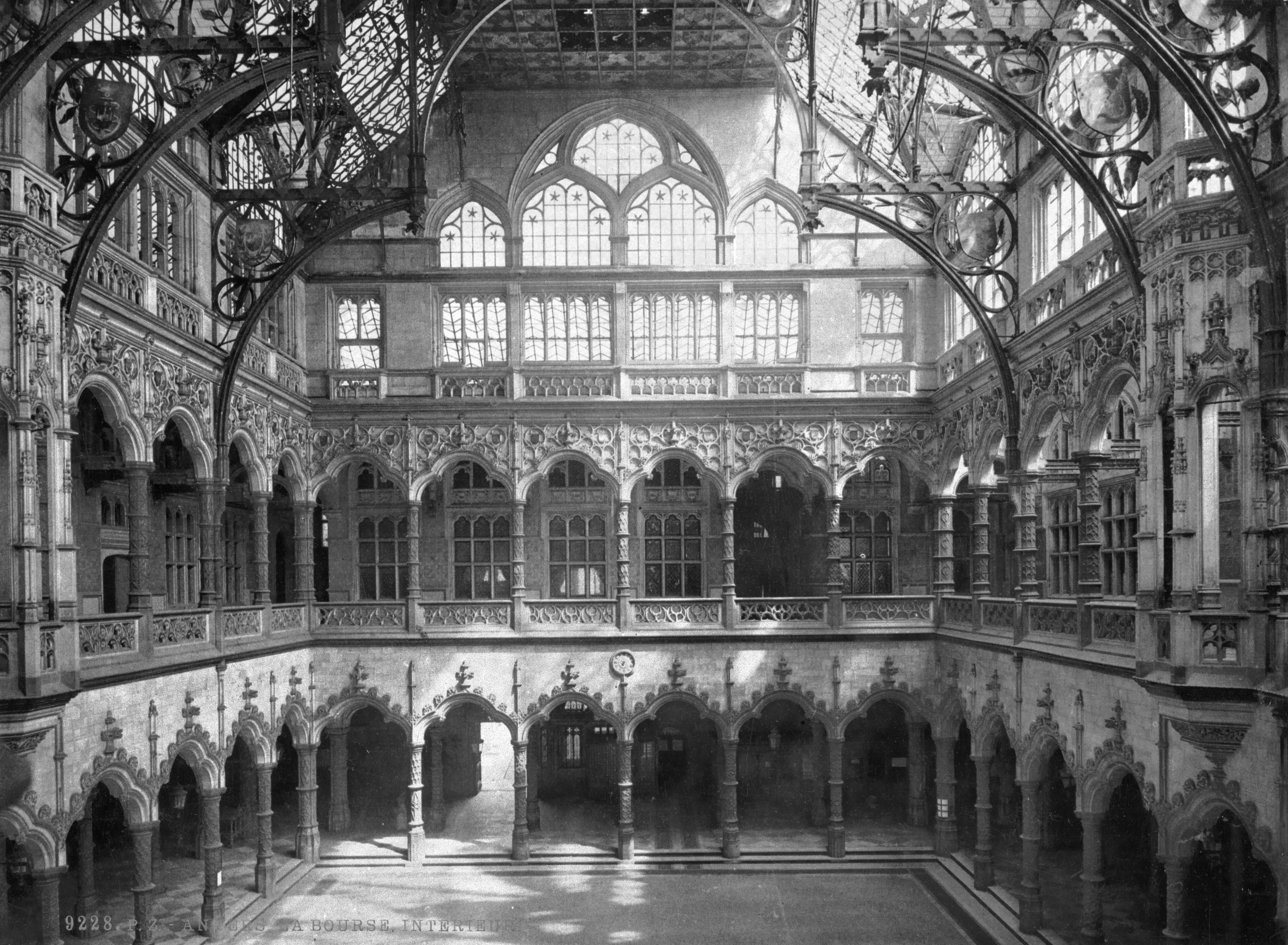
Trading floor, as it appeared after reconstruction for the purpose of housing a stock exchange in 1872 (1890)

After a second fire on 2 August 1858 had once again destroyed the building, the Antwerp city authorities twice organized a design competition in which the old concept had to be preserved. The current building was finally completed in 1872 by architect Joseph Schadde. It combined the neo-gothic style with revolutionary techniques, in particular in the metal construction used to cover the interior. The reconstructed building housed the Antwerp stock exchange, which opened in 1872. Stock were traded here until 1997, when this activity was merged into the Brussels Stock Exchange.

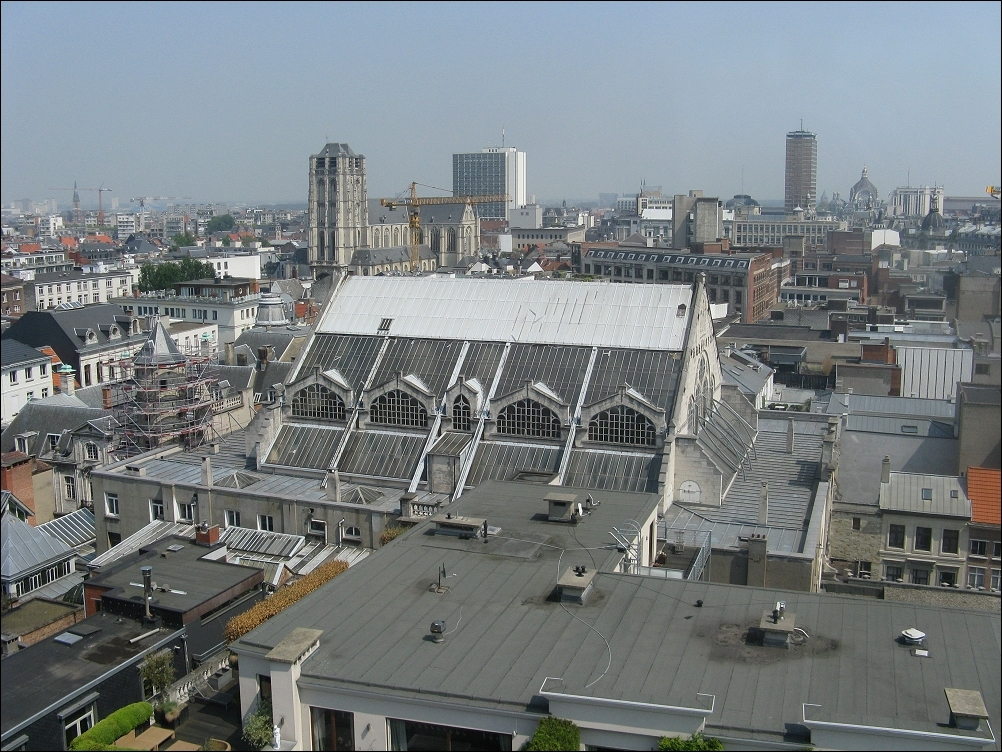
Bird eye view of current building

=== 1997–2019: Abandonment, archaeological excavation and renovations ===
With the closure of the stock exchange, the building lost its purpose and was abandoned and neglected. Various proposals to redevelop the building went nowhere for 15 years. The investment file started moving again in October 2013, after a new partner was found: the Marriott hotel chain. A heritage budget was also released from the Flemish government for the restoration of the Stock Exchange. In October 2014, it was announced that the new building application for the project was approved by the city of Antwerp. But at the beginning of December 2014, it became known that various local residents had appealed to the permanent deputation of the province against the building permit. In April 2015, the province confirmed the building permit on condition some adjustments were made to address the concerns of local residents.

In February 2016, as part of excavations to convert the site into a Marriott Hotel, various archaeological finds were made. Floor levels, walls, and a fireplace/oven from the late Middle Ages were found. Pile pits were also found under a number of walls that probably point to medieval timber construction. Dark gray sand was also found, indicating medieval garden and / or agriculture. The most remarkable find, however, was the discovery of some urns dating from the Iron Age. When the excavations and archaeological investigation are completed, an underground parking garage would be built under the former Stock Exchange.

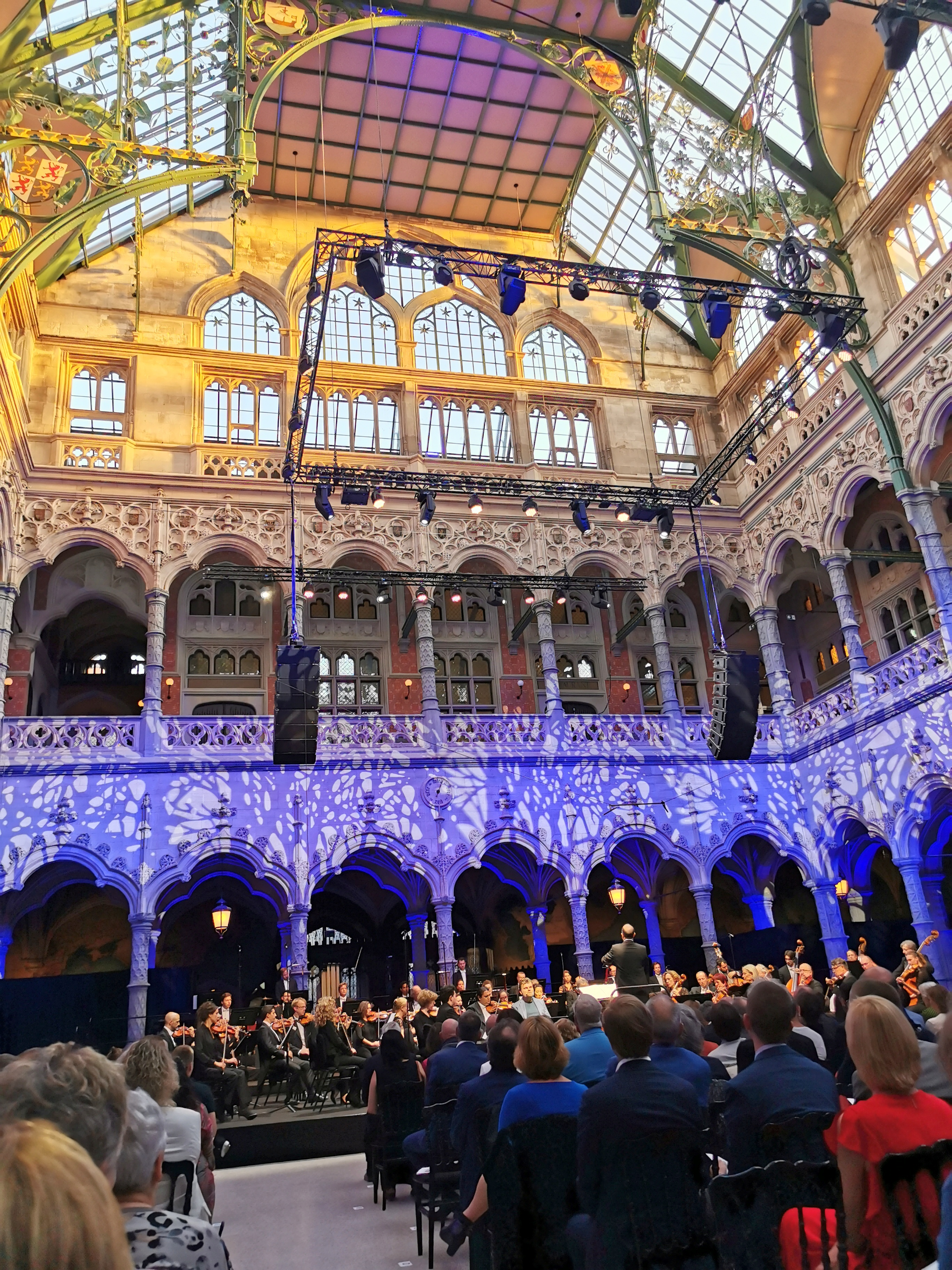
Present use of the trading floor as an event venue, after renovations completed in 2019 (2022)

=== 2019–present: Multipurpose venue ===
After a long and intensive renovation, it was reopened in October 2019 as an events venue (Antwerp Trade Fair) with restaurant, hotel and public passage. The ground floor with its central square is open to the public from Saturday to Sunday, between 10:00 and 17:00.

The building was used as a venue for the 2021 World Choir Games, co-hosted by Antwerp and Ghent.

== See also ==
- Brussels Stock Exchange
- Euronext
