= Euronext =

European financial services company

Euronext N.V.

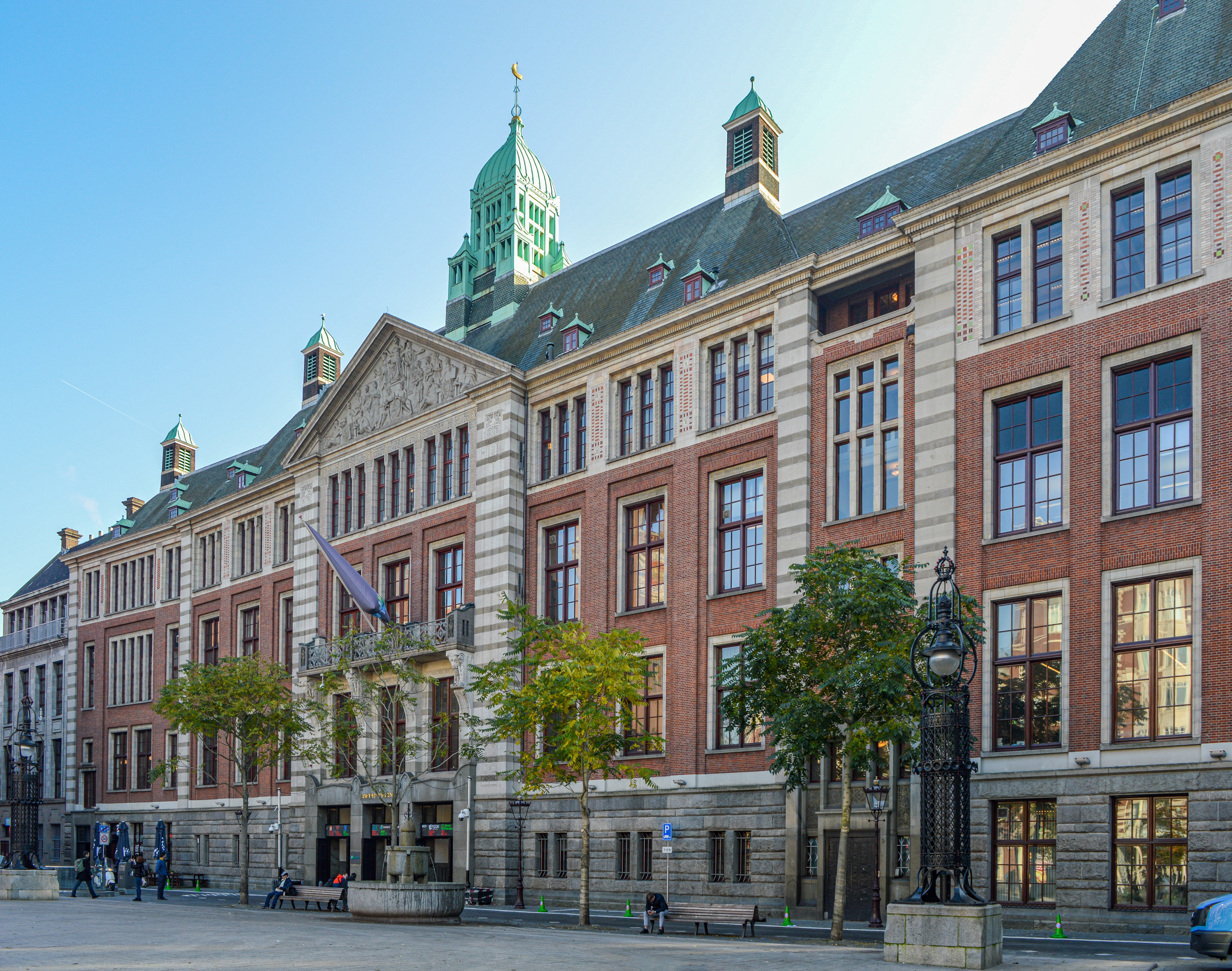
- Euronext's registered office is located in the Euronext Amsterdam building, Beursplein 5, Amsterdam.
- Type: Public (Naamloze vennootschap)
- Traded as: Euronext Paris: ENX; CAC 40 component
- ISIN: NL0006294274
- Industry: Financial services
- Founded: 1285; 741 years ago (as Huis ter Beurze); 1602; 424 years ago (as Amsterdam Stock Exchange); 1724; 302 years ago (as Paris Bourse); 22 September 2000; 26 years ago (present consortium)
- Headquarters: Paris, France (operational headquarters); Amsterdam, Netherlands (registered office)
- Key people: Stéphane Boujnah (CEO & chairman of the Managing Board)
- Revenue: €1.823 billion (2025)
- Net income: €642.9 million (2025)
- Number of employees: 2455 (2024)
- Subsidiaries: Euronext Clearing; Euronext Securities; Euronext FX; Commodity exchanges: Nord Pool; Fish Pool
- Website: www.euronext.com/en

Euronext N.V. (short for European New Exchange Technology) is a European bourse that provides trading and post-trade services for a range of financial instruments. It is registered in Amsterdam but its operational headquarters are located in Paris. It operates major stock exchanges in eight countries: France (Euronext Paris), the Netherlands (Euronext Amsterdam), Belgium (Euronext Brussels), Ireland (Euronext Dublin), Portugal (Euronext Lisbon), Italy (Borsa Italiana), Greece (Euronext Athens) and Norway (Euronext Oslo Børs). The present-day Euronext was spun off from the Intercontinental Exchange (ICE) in 2014, shortly after ICE's acquisition of NYSE Euronext the year before.

Traded assets include regulated equities, exchange-traded funds (ETF), warrants and certificates, bonds, derivatives, commodities, foreign exchange as well as indices. As of March 2025, Euronext operated nearly 1,800 listed issuers with a market capitalization of approximately €6.3 trillion.

Euronext is the largest center for debt and funds listings in the world, and provides technology and managed services to third parties. In addition to its main regulated market, it operates Euronext Growth and Euronext Access, providing access to listing for small and medium-sized enterprises. Euronext Paris accounts for more than 80% of Euronext’s total market cap. It also plays a key role in commodities trading, offering markets for power through Nord Pool and for fish through Fish Pool, alongside other agricultural commodities such as milling wheat and rapeseed.

Post-trade services include clearing performed by Euronext's multi-asset clearing house, Euronext Clearing, headquartered in Rome, as well as custody and settlement performed by Euronext's central securities depository (CSD), Euronext Securities.

Euronext traces its origins back to some of the world's oldest bourses, formed in the Low Countries' shifting trade centres, Bruges, Antwerp and Amsterdam in 1285, 1485 and 1602, respectively, as well as to the foundation of the Paris Bourse in 1724. In its present form, Euronext was established in September 2000 through the merger of the bourses in Amsterdam, Brussels and Paris. The goal was to create a single, integrated, and liquid market for securities trading across Europe. Since its inception, Euronext has continued to expand, and now operates stock exchanges in several European countries, including France, the Netherlands, Belgium, Portugal, Ireland, and Norway. Its creation was followed by the introduction of the single currency and harmonisation of financial markets.

In August 2023, the company formed EuroCTP as a joint venture with 13 other bourses, in an effort to provide a consolidated tape for the European Union, as part of the Capital Markets Union proposed by the European Commission.

== History ==
=== Background: Exchange companies that merged into Euronext ===
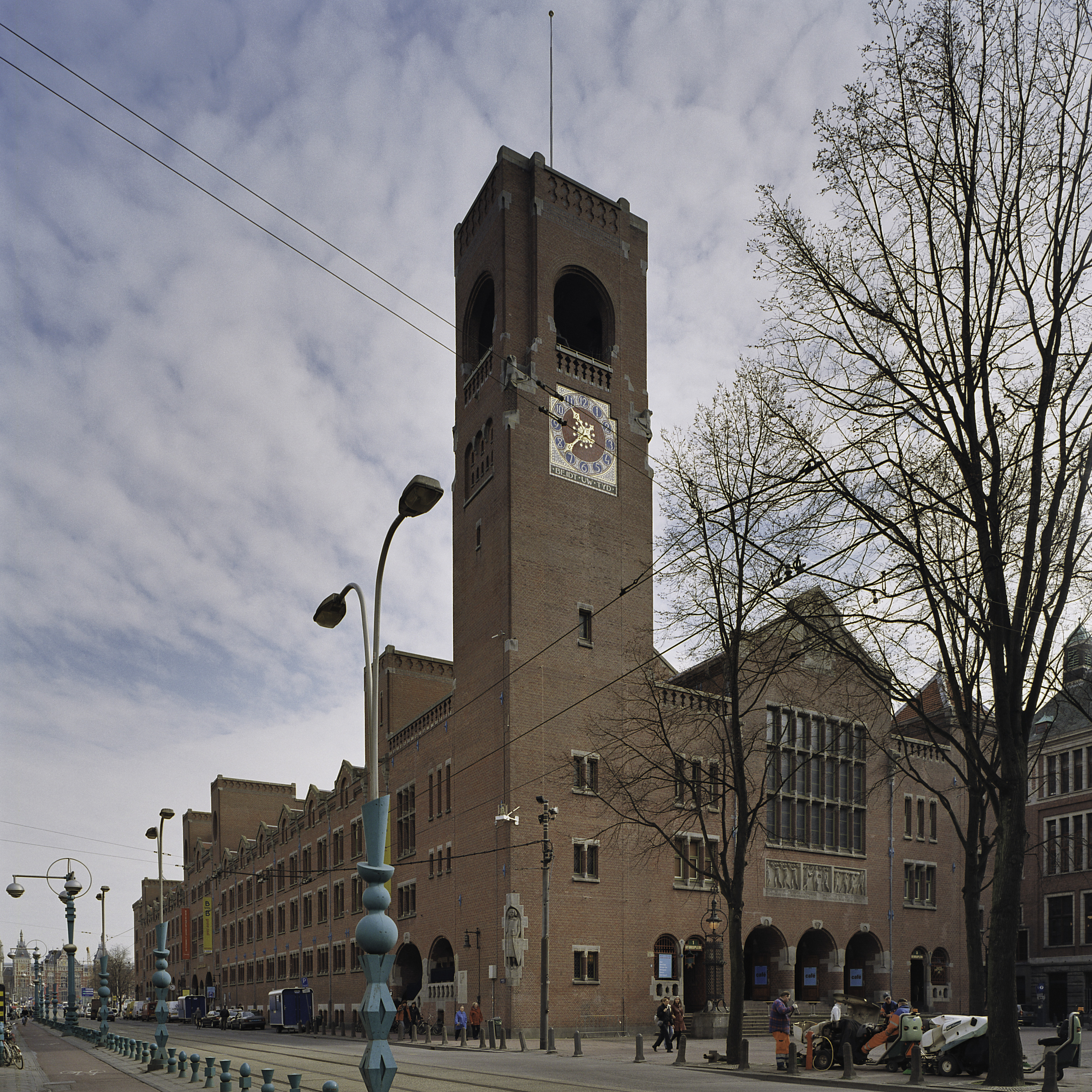
Beurs van Berlage in Amsterdam, now an events venue

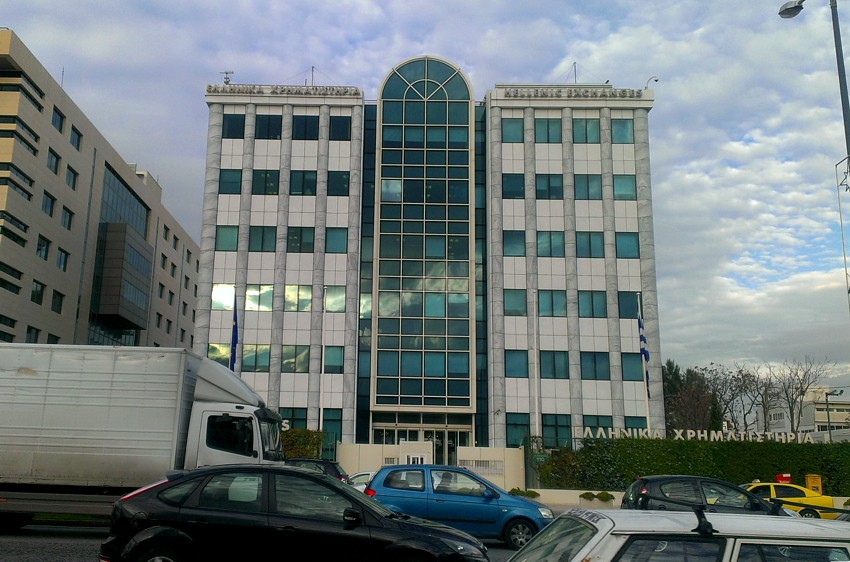
Stock exchange building in Athens

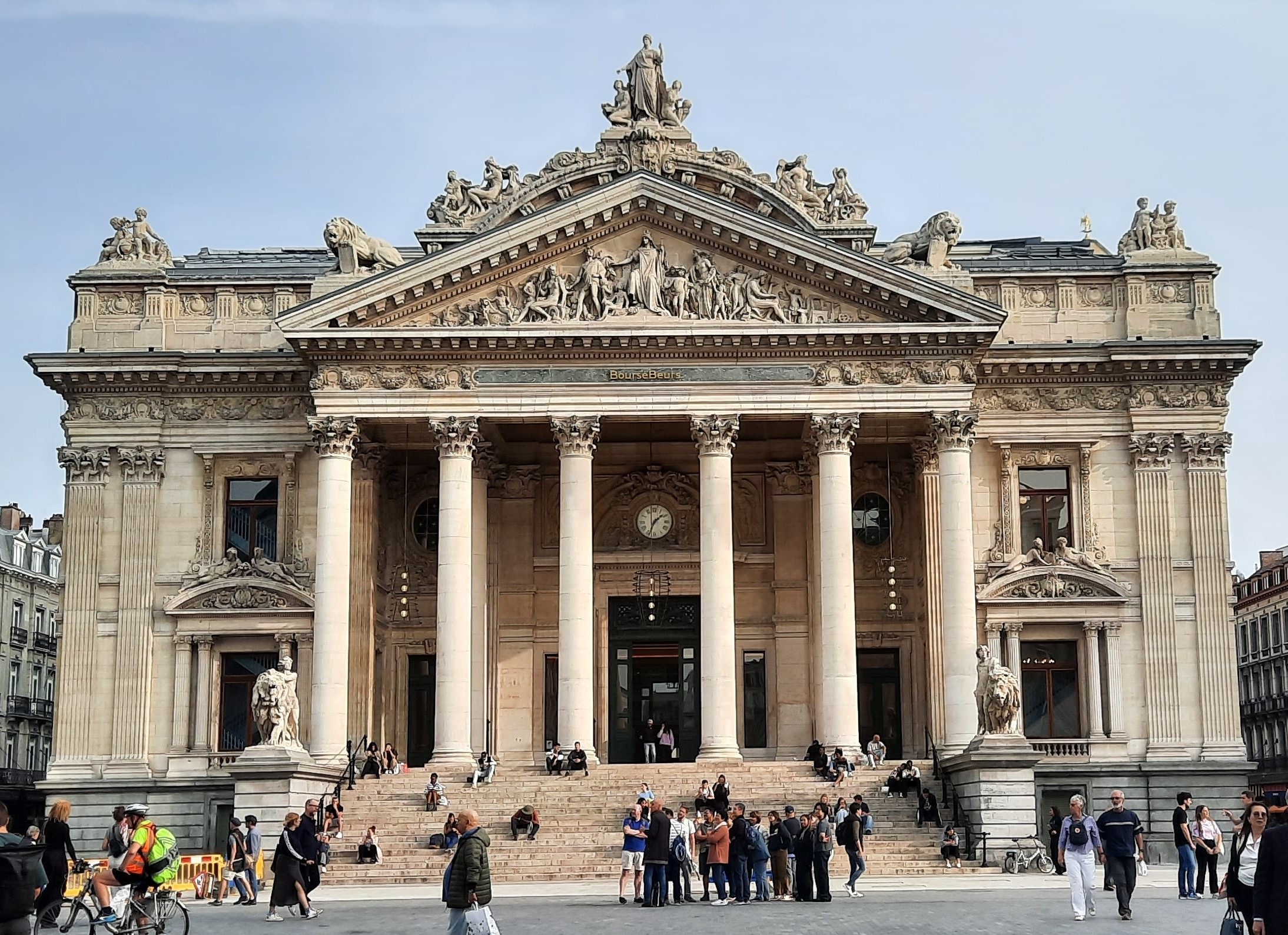
Bourse Palace in Brussels, now an events venue

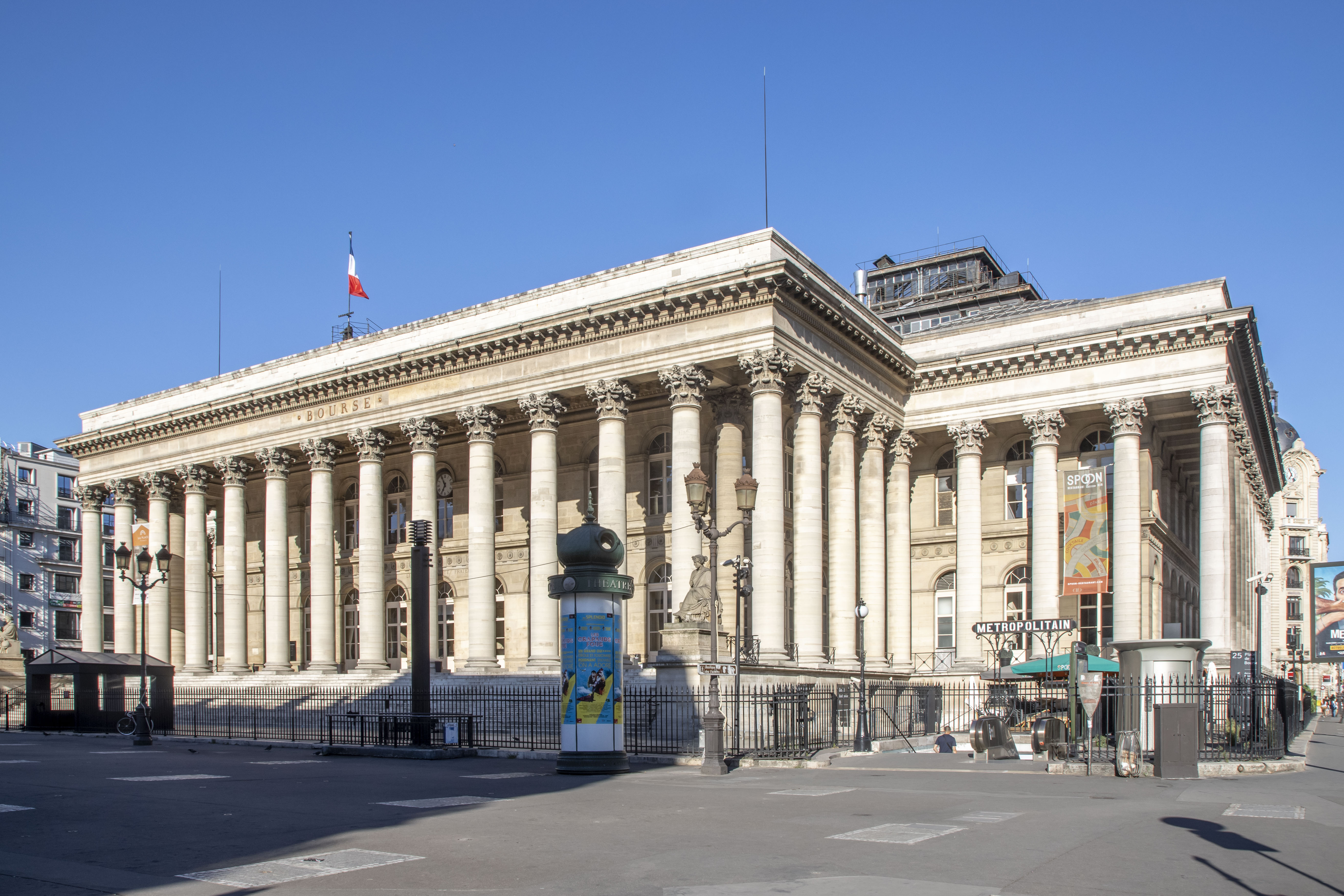
Palais Brongniart in Paris, now an events venue

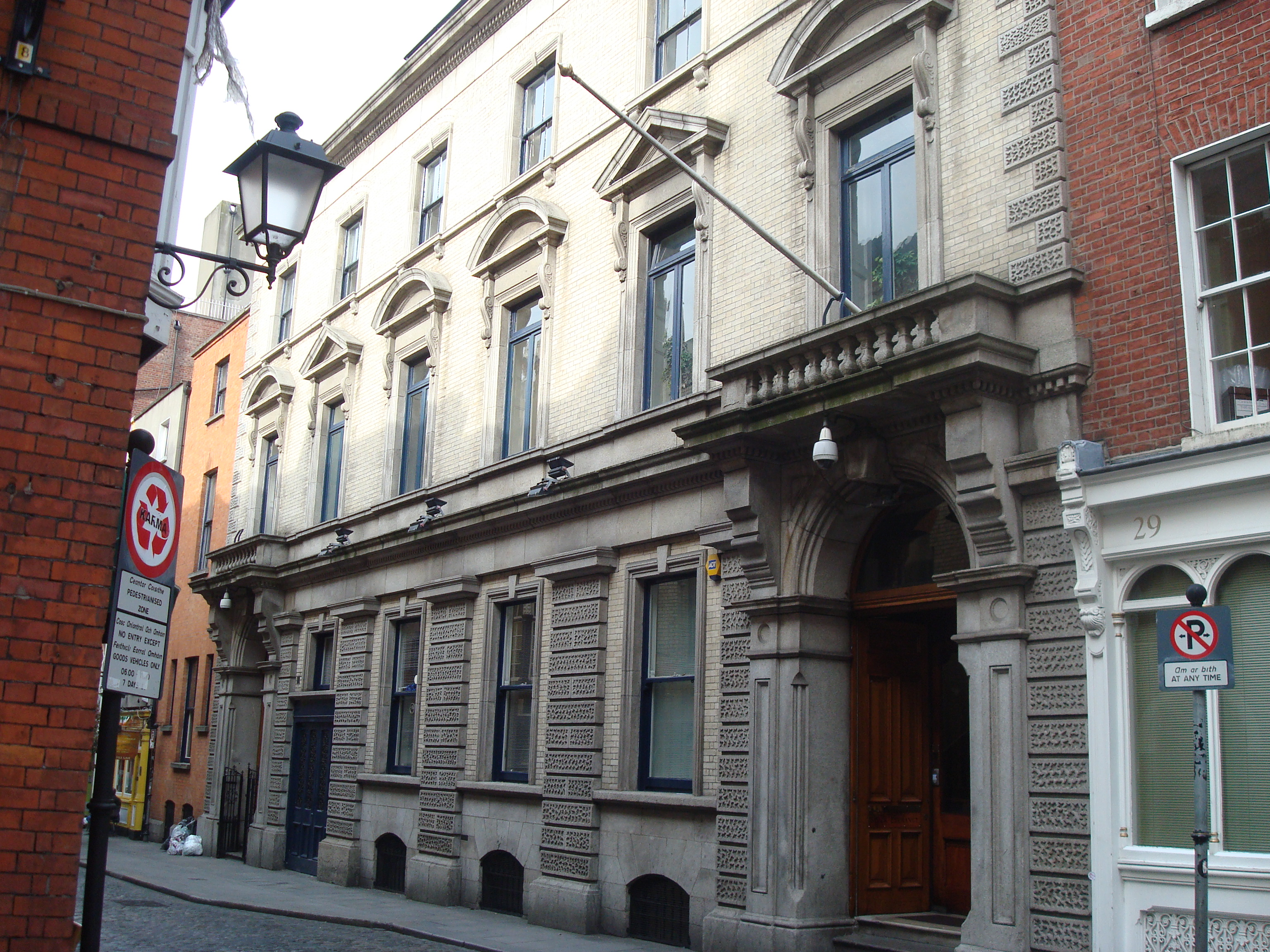
Stock exchange building in Dublin

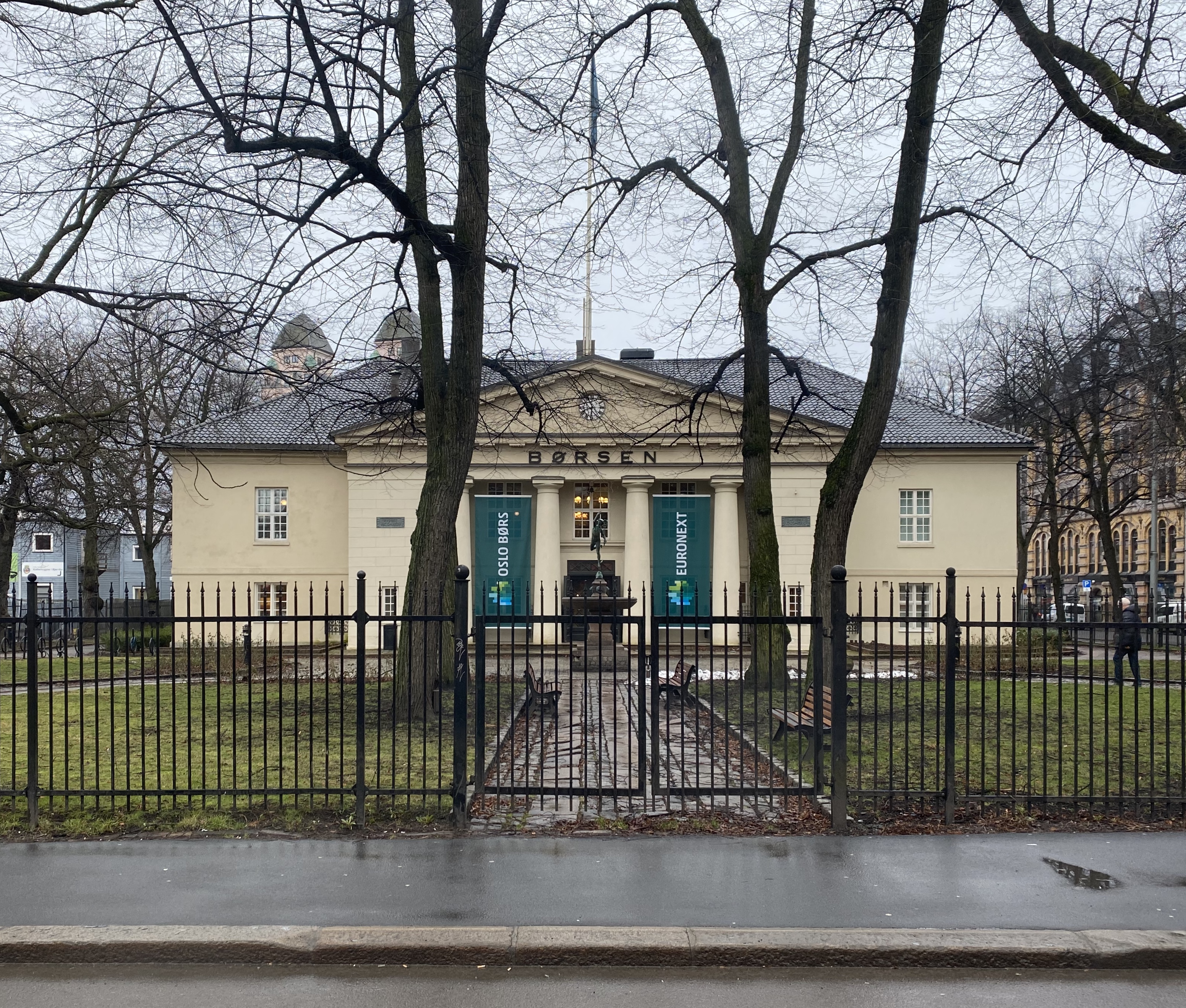
Stock exchange building in Oslo

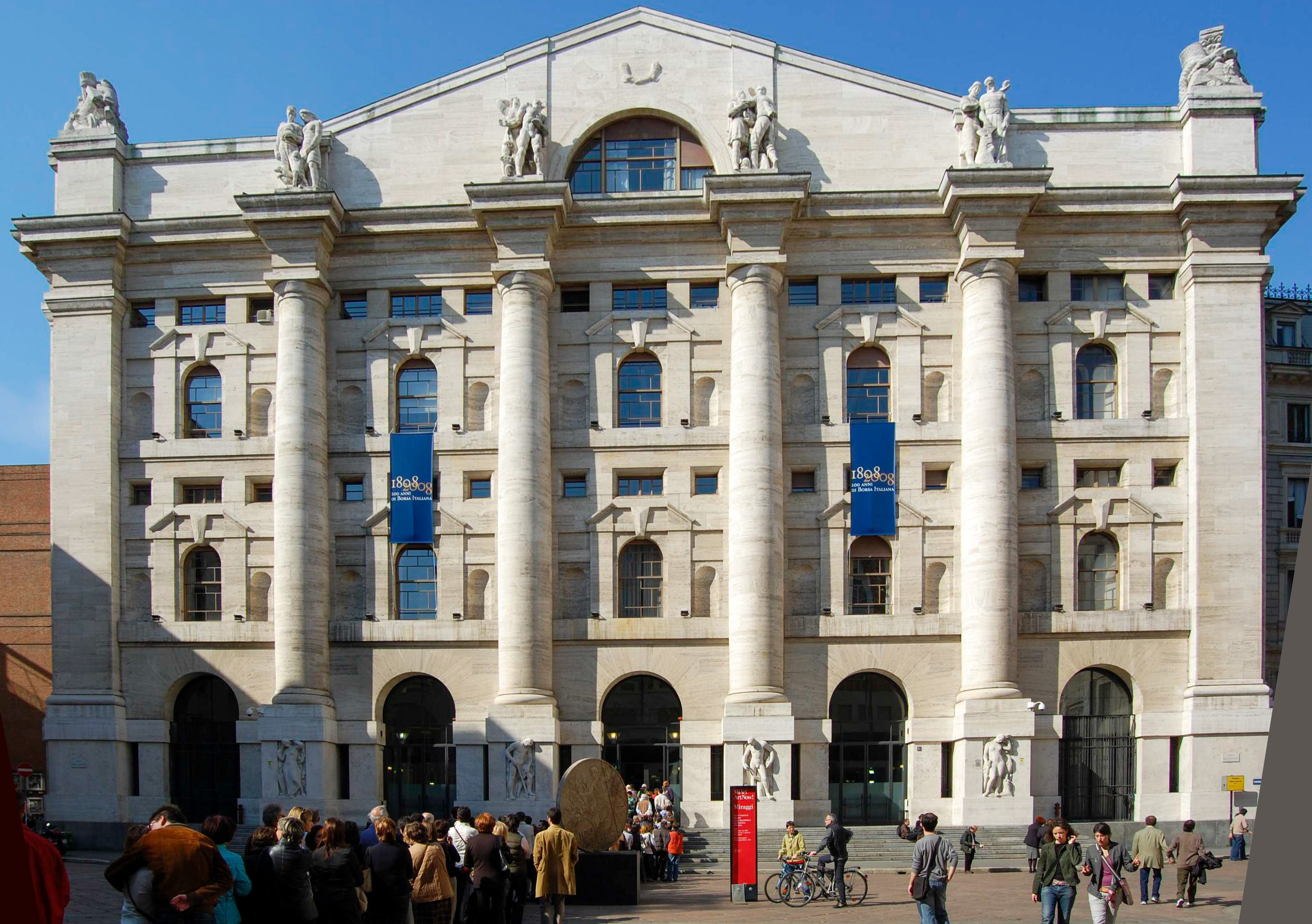
Palazzo Mezzanotte in Milan

=== 2000–2007: Founding merger and early acquisitions ===
Logo used between 2000 and 2007

In 1998, the London Stock Exchange and Deutsche Börse announced their intention of forming an alliance to fend off competition from the United States, and take advantage from the European Union's (EU) single currency and harmonisation of financial markets. In April 1999 the stock exchanges in Paris, Zurich, Madrid, Brussels, Amsterdam, and Milan signed a memorandum of understanding in Madrid, which formalised plans to include these bourses as well.

Ultimately, only three decided to proceed, and on 22 September 2000 Euronext was formed following a merger of the Amsterdam Stock Exchange, Brussels Stock Exchange, and Paris Bourse.

In 2001, Euronext became a listed company itself after completing its initial public offering.

In December 2001, Euronext acquired the shares of the London International Financial Futures and Options Exchange (LIFFE), forming Euronext.LIFFE.

In 2002, the group merged with the Portuguese stock exchange Bolsa de Valores de Lisboa e Porto (BVLP), renamed Euronext Lisbon.

In 2003, Euronext cash products were integrated onto a single platform (NSC).

In 2004, Euronext derivatives products were integrated onto LIFFE CONNECT.

In 2005, Euronext introduced Alternext as a market segment to help finance small and mid-class companies in the Eurozone.

=== 2007–2014: Merger with the New York Stock Exchange and acquisition by Intercontinental Exchange ===
Logo of NYSE Euronext from 2007 to 2012, based on NYSE's previous logo

Logo used by NYSE Euronext from 2012 to 2014, which apart from "NYSE" was kept by the spun-off Euronext. Designed by Interbrand, the logo depicts a pixelated globe.

Due to apparent moves by NASDAQ to acquire the London Stock Exchange or Euronext itself, NYSE Group, owner of the New York Stock Exchange (NYSE), offered €8 billion (US$10.2b) in cash and shares for Euronext on 22 May 2006, outbidding a rival offer for the European Stock exchange operator from Deutsche Börse, the German stock market. Contrary to statements that it would not raise its bid, on 23 May 2006, Deutsche Börse unveiled a merger bid for Euronext, valuing the pan-European exchange at €8.6 billion (US$11b), €600 million over NYSE Group's initial bid. Despite this, NYSE Group and Euronext penned a merger agreement, subject to shareholder vote and regulatory approval. The initial regulatory response by SEC chief Christopher Cox (who was coordinating heavily with European counterparts) was positive, with an expected approval by the end of 2007.

Deutsche Börse dropped out of the bidding for Euronext on 15 November 2006, removing the last major hurdle for the NYSE Euronext transaction. A run-up of NYSE Group's stock price in late 2006 made the offering far more attractive to Euronext's shareholders. On 19 December 2006, Euronext shareholders approved the transaction with 98.2% of the vote. Only 1.8% voted in favour of the Deutsche Börse offer. Jean-François Théodore, the chief executive officer of Euronext, stated that they expected the transaction to close within three or four months. Some of the regulatory agencies with jurisdiction over the merger had already given approval. NYSE Group shareholders gave their approval on 20 December 2006. The merger was completed on 4 April 2007, forming NYSE Euronext.

The new firm, NYSE Euronext, was headquartered in New York City, with European operations and its trading platform run out of Paris. Then-NYSE CEO John Thain, who was to head NYSE Euronext, intended to use the combination to form the world's first global stock market, with continuous trading of stocks and derivatives over a 21-hour time span. In addition, the two exchanges hoped to add Borsa Italiana (the Milan stock exchange) into the grouping.

In 2008 and 2009 Deutsche Börse made two unsuccessful attempts to merge with NYSE Euronext. Both attempts did not enter into advanced steps of merger. In 2011, Deutsche Börse and NYSE Euronext confirmed that they were in advanced merger talks. Such a merger would create the largest exchange in history. The deal was approved by shareholders of NYSE Euronext on 7 July 2011, and Deutsche Börse on 15 July 2011 and won the antitrust approved by the US regulators on 22 December 2011. On 1 February 2012, the deal was blocked by European Commission on the grounds that the new company would have resulted in a quasi-monopoly in the area of European financial derivatives traded globally on exchanges. Deutsche Börse unsuccessfully appealed this decision.

In 2012, Euronext announced the creation of Euronext London to offer listing facilities in the UK. As such, Euronext received in June 2014 Recognized Investment Exchange (RIE) status from Britain's Financial Conduct Authority.

On 20 December 2012, the boards of directors of both Intercontinental Exchange (ICE) and the NYSE Euronext approved an $8 billion acquisition of NYSE Euronext. Under the terms shareholders of NYSE would receive either $33.12 in cash for each share or .2581 IntercontinentalExchange Inc. shares, or a combination of $11.27 in cash per share plus .1703 shares of stock. The acquisition is subject to regulator approval, though since the operations of ICE and NYSE have little in common—ICE is largely devoted to trading commodities, as opposed to NYSE's business of trading stocks and securities—the deal is not expected to be blocked. ICE said that after the deal closed it would sell the Euronext portion of the company, including stock exchanges in Amsterdam, Brussels, Lisbon and Paris. The deal went through and Euronext is a sister division to NYSE and part of ICE. ICE CEO Jeffrey Sprecher would continue in that position at the combined company, while NYSE CEO Duncan Niederauer would serve as president. The future of the New York Stock Exchange's historic trading floor under ICE has not been announced. ICE closed the high profile and historic trading floors of its other earlier acquisitions, the International Petroleum Exchange and the New York Board of Trade in New York.

In May 2013, Euronext established Enternext as a subsidiary to help small and medium-size enterprises (SMEs) listed on Euronext outline and apply a strategy most suited to support their growth.

The ICE's deal was approved by the shareholders of NYSE Euronext and Intercontinental Exchange on 3 June 2013. The European Commission approved the acquisition on 24 June 2013 and on 15 August 2013 the US regulator, SEC, granted approval of the acquisition. European regulators and ministries of Finance of the participating countries approved the deal and on 13 November 2013 the acquisition was completed.

=== 2014–present: Spin-off from ICE and subsequent development ===
The composition of the Reference Shareholders as of 30 April 2024 is as follows:
- Dutch ABN AMRO (0.52%)
- French Deposits and Consignments Fund (8.04%)
- Italian CDP Equity (8.04%)
- Belgium-based Euroclear Group (5.63%)
- Italian Intesa Sanpaolo (1.54%)
- Belgian Federal Holding and Investment Company (5.31%)
View source data.

Part of ICE's deal to acquire NYSE Euronext was a spin-off for Euronext, which was considered a positive element for European stakeholders. After a complex series of operations, this occurred on 20 June 2014, through an initial public offering (IPO). The former Euronext.LIFFE was retained by ICE and renamed ICE Futures Europe. In order to stabilise Euronext, a consortium of eleven investors decided to invest in the company as "reference shareholders". These investors owned 33.36% of Euronext's capital and have a 3 years lockup period: Euroclear, BNP Paribas, BNP Paribas Fortis, Société Générale, Caisse des Dépôts, BPI France, ABN Amro, ASR, Banco Espírito Santo, Banco BPI and Belgian holding public company Belgian Federal Holding and Investment Company (SFPI/FPIM). They have 3 board seats.

In June 2014, EnterNext launched two initiatives to boost SME equity research and support the technology sector. EnterNext partnered with Morningstar to increase equity research focusing on mid-size companies, especially in the telecommunications, media and technology (TMT) sector.

On 22 September 2014, Euronext announced a partnership with DEGIRO regarding the distribution of retail services of Euronext. Upon publishing the third quarter results for 2014, the partnership was seen as a plan for Euronext to compete more effectively on the Dutch retail segment.

In May 2017, Alternext was renamed to Euronext Growth.

On 14 August 2017, Euronext announced the completion of its acquisition of FastMatch, a currency trading platform.

On 27 March 2018, Euronext announced the completion of its acquisition of the Irish Stock Exchange, rebranded as Euronext Dublin, to expand its reach into the debt and funds markets.

On 18 June 2019, Euronext announced the completion of its acquisition of the Oslo Stock Exchange.

On 5 December 2019, Euronext announced that it would acquire 66% of the European power exchange Nord Pool. The acquisition was completed on 15 January 2020.

On 23 April 2020, Euronext announced that it would acquire ca. 70% of the Danish Central Securities Depository, VP Securities. The acquisition was completed on 4 August 2020.

On 18 September 2020, as part of regulatory remedies to see through its $27 billion purchase of data provider Refinitiv, the London Stock Exchange Group (LSEG) entered into exclusive talks to sell the Italian Bourse (formally 100% of London Stock Exchange Group Holdings Italia S.p.A.), situated in Milan, to Euronext. As part of the deal, CDP Equity, 100% owned by Cassa Depositi e Prestiti, and Intesa Sanpaolo would become Euronext reference shareholders.

In April 2021, Euronext completed the acquisition of the Borsa Italiana Group for €4.4 billion, enhancing its leadership in the European financial markets. This acquisition integrated the Milan Stock Exchange (Borsa Italiana) and its subsidiary MTS, a leader in fixed income markets, into Euronext. As of 2024, Euronext has further consolidated its market position through technological advancements, partnerships, and sustainability initiatives.

On 23 August 2023, Euronext formed EuroCTP as a joint venture with 13 other bourses, in an effort to provide a consolidated tape for the European Union, as part of the Capital Markets Union proposed by the European Commission.

In November 2024, Euronext announced a new three-year strategic plan titled "Innovate for Growth 2027", aimed at accelerating revenue growth through innovation and business diversification. The plan focuses on three main priorities:

1. Growth in non-volume-related activities: expansion of post-trade services, data solutions, and technology services, which currently account for 60% of total revenues.
2. Expansion in fixed income, currencies, and commodities (FICC) markets: enhancing trading and clearing capabilities, with a particular focus on the energy market through Nord Pool.
3. Leadership in equity trading: strengthening Euronext's dominant position in equity markets and becoming the leading ETF market in Europe.

The strategic plan reaffirms Euronext's commitment to sustainability and ESG by setting a Net Zero target for 2027. It also states a target of an annual revenue and income growth of over 5%, with capital expenditure (CAPEX) estimated between 4% and 6% of total revenues. In addition, Euronext announced a share buyback program of up to €300 million, set to be completed within a maximum of 12 months starting in November 2024.

On 1 July 2025, Euronext announced that it submitted a takeover offer in order to acquire Athens Stock Exchange. Discussions focused on a potential all-share deal valued at approximately $470 million. On 6 October 2025, Euronext launched a voluntary exchange offer for all ATHEX shares and announced on 19 November 2025 that the offer was successful, with Euronext obtaining a controlling stake of 74.3% of ATHEX, thus resulting in the acquisition of Athens Stock Exchange by Euronext.

== Operations ==
=== Trading services ===
==== Equity ====
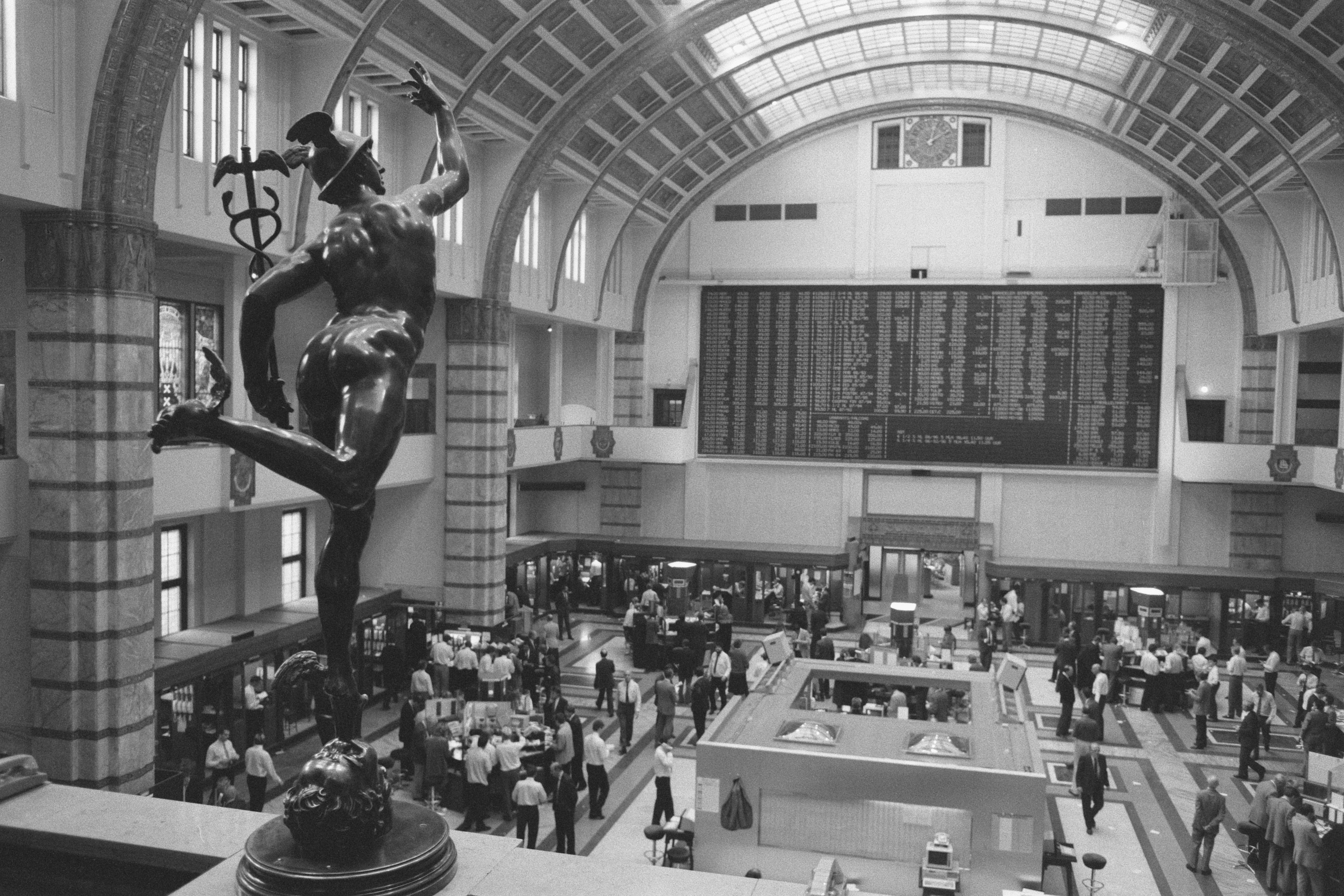
The trading floor at Euronext's registered office in Amsterdam

Listing of Euro Stoxx 50 companies as of 2021:
1. Euronext: 28 (56.0%)
2. Deutsche Börse (FWB/Xetra): 12 (23.0%)
3. SIX: 6 (12.0%)
4. Other (9.00%)
Euronext's local listing venues

Euronext operates its main regulated market, as well two types of multilateral trading facilities (MTFs) providing access to listing for small and medium-sized enterprises (SMEs), titled Euronext Growth and Euronext Access.

Euronext maintains a single order book at its proprietary market platform Optiq.

Euronext markets (September 2020)
Topology		EU regulated	Multilateral trading facilities	
Market		Euronext	Euronext Growth	Euronext Access
Number of issuers		776	229	180
Avg. valuation at initial public offering (€m)	Size	278.1	22.8	0.1
Avg. valuation at initial public offering (€m)	Market cap.	5,514	97	51
Availability at listing venues (operating market identifier code)
Amsterdam		Yes XAMS	No	No
Athens		Yes ?	No	No
Brussels		Yes XBRU	Yes ALXB	Yes MLXB
Lisbon		Yes XLIS	Yes ALXL	Yes ENXL
Dublin		Yes XMSM	Yes XESM	No
Milan		Yes XMIL	Yes EXGM	No
Oslo		Yes XOSL	Yes MERK	No
Paris		Yes XPAR	Yes ALXP	Yes XMLI

Euronext manages various country (national), as well as pan-European regional and sector and strategy indices.

Flagship indices managed by Euronext
Name	Symbol	Trading Currency
European
(European Union) Euronext 100	N100	EUR
National
(Netherlands) AEX	AEX	EUR
(Greece) GD	GD	EUR
(Belgium) BEL 20	BEL20	EUR
(France) CAC 40	PX1	EUR
(Republic of Ireland) ISEQ 20	ISEQ20	EUR
(Italy) FTSE MIB	MIB	EUR
(Portugal) PSI 20	PSI20	EUR
(Norway) OBX 25	OBX	NOK

==== Foreign exchange ====
Euronext FX is a global foreign exchange trading platform, known as FastMatch until 2019.

==== Commodities ====
Euronext offers trading in a number of physical commodities such as Electric power (Nord Pool), salmon futures (Fish Pool), milling wheat, rapeseed, corn, durum wheat, and wood pellets.

==== Derivatives ====
Euronext operates derivatives markets.

==== Debt and funds listings ====
Euronext is the largest centre for debt and funds listings in the world.

==== Exchange-traded funds ====
Euronext's product range also includes exchange-traded funds.

=== Post-trade services ===
==== Central securities depository ====
Euronext provides custody and settlement services through its central securities depository (CSD), Euronext Securities, based on Euronext's ownership of previous national CSDs in Denmark, Italy, Norway and Portugal.

==== Clearing ====
Between 2016 and 2019 Euronext owned a 20% share in European Central Counterparty N.V. (EuroCCP).

As of December 2019, Euronext owns an 11.1% share in LCH SA.

As part of its acquisition of the Italian Bourse in 2021, Euronext obtained the multi-asset clearing house Cassa di Compensazione e Garanzia S.p.A. (CC&G). CC&G was renamed Euronext Clearing.

=== Corporate solutions ===
Euronext Corporate Solutions (formerly Euronext Corporate Services) is a wholly owned subsidiary of Euronext, established in 2016 under the group's "Agility for Growth" strategic plan to provide software and advisory services to listed and non-listed organisations in areas such as governance, regulatory compliance and investor relations. As of 2025, it served around 5,000 organisations in some 30 countries.

The business has been built partly through acquisitions. In 2017, Euronext acquired majority stakes in Company Webcast, now EngageStream, a Dutch webcasting provider, and iBabs, a Dutch board portal provider; it acquired the remaining 40% of iBabs in 2021 for €53.2 million. In 2018, Euronext acquired 80% of InsiderLog, a Stockholm-based provider of insider-list management software used for compliance with the EU Market Abuse Regulation, for €5.8 million.

In May 2025, Euronext completed the acquisition of Admincontrol, an Oslo-based provider of board portal and secure collaboration software active in the Nordic countries and the United Kingdom, from Visma for approximately €398 million (NOK 4.65 billion), roughly doubling the size of the subsidiary's governance software business.

=== Financial information ===
(amounts in millions)
Year	Revenue	EBITDA	Net result
2014	€458,5	€225,4	€118,2
2015	€518,5	€283,8	€172,7
2016	€496,4	€283,9	€197,0
2017	€532,3	€297,8	€241,3
2018	€615,0	€354,3	€216,0
2019	€679,1	€399,4	€222,0
2020	€884,3	€520,0	€315,5
2021	€1298,7	€752,8	€413,3
2022	€1418,8	€861,6	€437,8
2023	€1474,7	€864,7	€555,3
2024	€1626,9	€1006,5	€585,6
2025	€1823,2	€1143,1	€642,9

== See also ==
- Bourse of Antwerp, the world's first financial exchange
- Economy of the European Union
- Euroclear
- List of European stock exchanges
- List of stock exchanges
