= Château de La Coste (Lot) =

Ruined castle in Occitania, France

Coordinates: 44.4769°N 1.1577°E

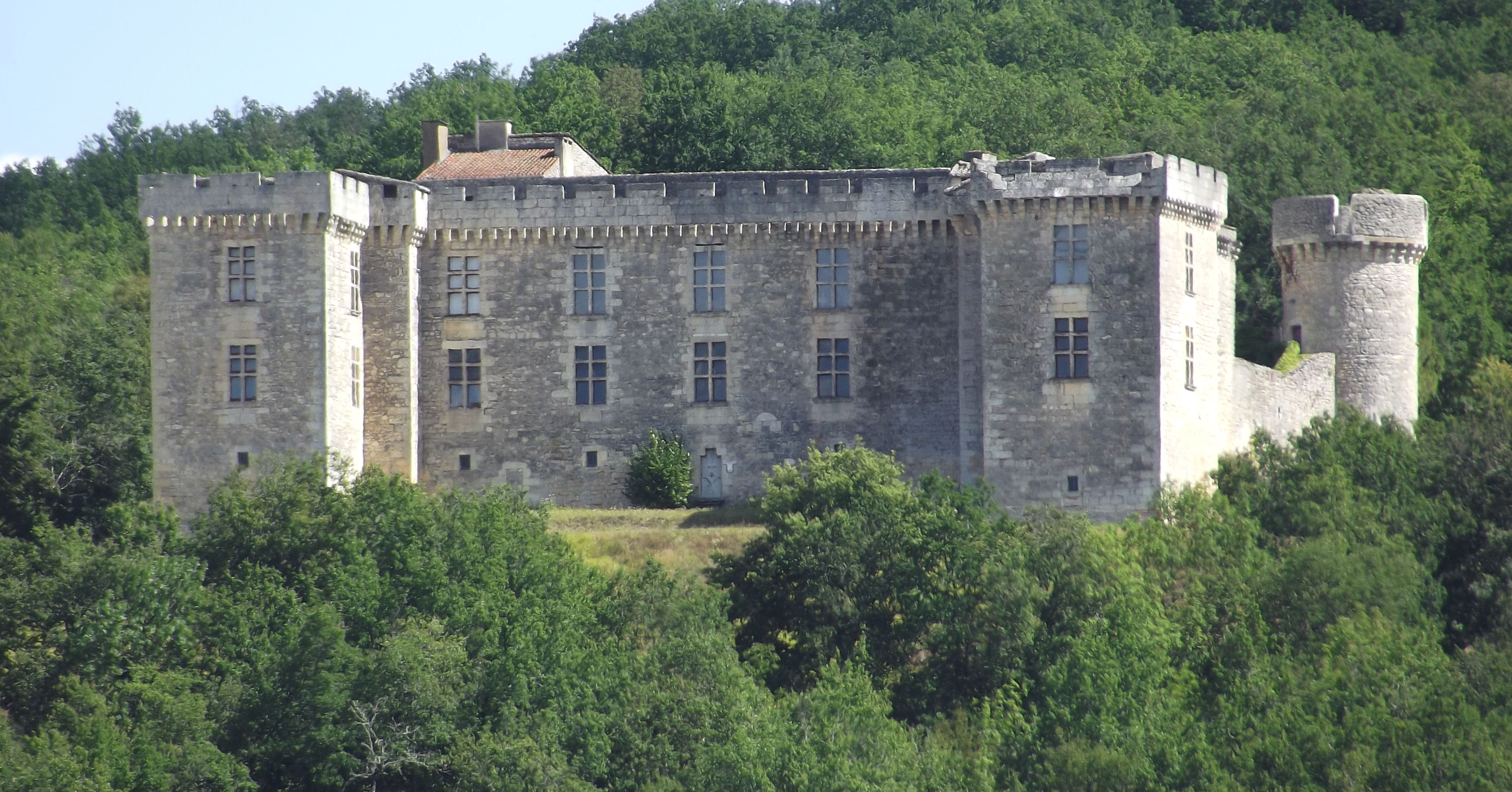
Castle of La Coste

The Château de La Coste is a ruined castle in the commune of Grézels in the Lot département of France.

The castle exhibits military architecture of the 14th and 15th centuries. It was restored at the end of the 16th century after it was ruined in 1580 during its capture by Protestant troops. Originally a simple watch tower, the square plan castle is flanked by two massive square towers in the west and two round towers in the east. It comprises a rectangular corps de logis extended by two wings and a curtain wall in the south which encloses the courtyard. The north wing (former stables), having been used as a source of stones to build the house of a former owner, was equipped with an open gallery to ensure weatherproofing. The structure was served by a right handed staircase. The two square towers still have the latrines in the corner made with the corps de logis. The castle was sold as state property in 1793.

The castle is privately owned and closed to the public. It has been listed since 1961 as a monument historique by the French Ministry of Culture.

== See also ==
- List of castles in France
