= Château de Lacoste (Lot) =

Ruined castle in Occitania, France

Coordinates: 44.6814°N 1.2635°E

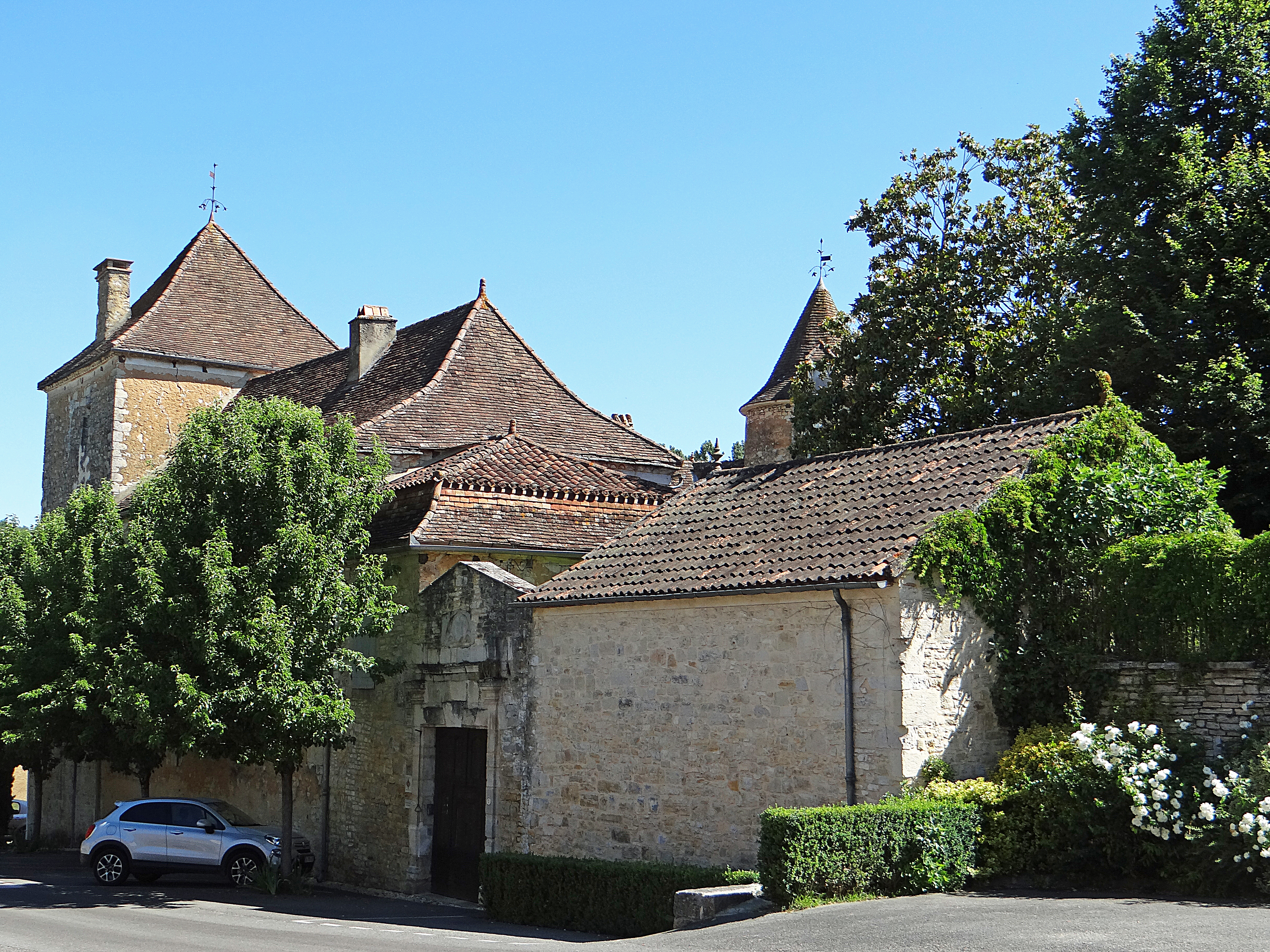
The castle entrance and facade on the west side

The Château de Lacoste is a ruined castle in the commune of Salviac in the Lot département of France.

The castle dates originally from the 11th century. There were further additions and alterations, most significantly in the 12th, 15th, 16th and 18th centuries. The castle is built on the walls of older fortifications. It consists of three corps de logis grouped around a courtyard; a more recent building has grown along the park. A stone spiral staircase, in the angle formed between two buildings, gives access from the courtyard to various buildings at different levels. In the 18th century, a large perron was constructed at the length of the courtyard façade of the western logis. A second perron, now dismantled, gave access from the park to the southern buildings. Inside, rooms have kept their 17th-century woodwork, with plafonds à la française (French-style ceilings: joists the same width as the spaces between them; see Plafond à la française in French Wikipedia).

The castle is privately owned and not open to the public. It has been listed since 1962 as a monument historique by the French Ministry of Culture.

== See also ==
- List of castles in France
