= Euronext Growth =

European trading market

Euronext Growth is a multilateral trading facility (MTF) operated by Euronext. This equity trading market was opened on 17 May 2005 to address an opportunity posed by small to medium-sized firms that were anticipated to desire easier access to an equity market.

The approach was to provide streamlined listing requirements and simplified trading rules to present a lesser load on small and mid-cap firms. The goal was to do this in a manner that also preserved good governance and transparency for investors.

Euronext bills the Euronext Growth market as a unique option in the investing world. It aims to become the reference market for small and mid-sized companies throughout the eurozone.

== Overview ==
Euronext Growth serves as an alternative to the Euronext's regulated main market, focused on SMEs that may not yet meet the listing requirements for the main market or that prefer a more flexible framework. Euronext Growth is also Multilateral Trading Facility (MTF), which is subject to lighter regulation compared to the main market.

Euronext Growth offers simplified listing process and reduced regulatory requirements.
