= Henry Lacoste =

Belgian architect (1885–1968)

- Born: January 16, 1885; Tournai, Belgium
- Died: April 28, 1968 (aged 83); Brussels, Belgium
- Education: École des Beaux-Arts
- Occupation: Architect
- Buildings: Queen Elisabeth Medical Foundation; Academic libraries in Leuven (Reading Room Leuven University)

Henry Lacoste (January 16, 1885 - April 28, 1968) was a Belgian architect and archaeologist.

His work is characterised by the extensive use of Art Deco style and motifs as well as solid wood. Two of his most renown works include The Queen Elisabeth Medical Foundation, in Brussels (1927) and the Leuven Library Reading Room, which today contains 44,000 books.
