= Sepehr Energy Jahan =

Iranian energy company

Sepehr Energy Jahan Nama Pars Company
- Native name: شرکت سپهر انرژی جهان نما پارس
- Romanized name: Sherkat-e Sepehr Energy Jahan Nama Pars
- Type: State-owned enterprise
- Industry: Oil and petrochemical trade
- Founded: November 21, 2022
- Founder: Ministry of Defense and Armed Forces Logistics (MODAFL)
- Headquarters: Tehran, Iran
- Key people: Majid Rashidi (Managing Director)
- Parent: Armed Forces General Staff (AFGS)
- Subsidiaries: Sepehr Energy Hamta Pars; Sepehr Energy Jahan Nama Taban; Sepehr Energy Paya Gostar Jahan

Sepehr Energy Jahan Nama Pars Company (commonly Sepehr Energy) has been identified by United States authorities as a key front for Iran's military in evading international sanctions on the oil and petrochemical sectors. Established in late 2022, Sepehr Energy is controlled by Iran's Ministry of Defense and Armed Forces Logistics (MODAFL) and operates under the umbrella of the Armed Forces General Staff (AFGS). U.S. sanctions describe it as "a front company for Iran's government oil sales" that generates revenue to fund the regime's ballistic missile program and proxy groups such as Hamas and Hezbollah. As the U.S. Department of the Treasury explained, Sepehr Energy and its affiliates "use deceitful evasion methods such as falsification of maritime documents to obfuscate the Iranian origin of the oil that it trades and transports to overseas buyers, including the People's Republic of China".

== Organizational structure and leadership ==
Sepehr Energy Jahan Nama Pars is officially registered in Tehran (established 21 November 2022) and has the features of a state-controlled oil company. The U.S. Treasury Dept. has reported that Sepehr Energy "oversees" the sale of Iranian oil on behalf of the AFGS. Its executive team is deeply connected to Iran's oil ministry and military apparatus. The company's deputy chairman and managing director is Majid Rashidi, an Iranian Oil Ministry official. Seyyed Abdoljavad Alavi was explicitly designated by the U.S. in November 2023 as a leader and official of Sepehr Energy under counter-terrorism sanctions. Other senior figures include Farbod Mohseni Ahari, who serves as chairman of Sepehr Energy Paya Gostar Jahan (a Sepehr-affiliated firm), and Farshad Ghazi, Managing Director of Sepehr Energy Hamta Pars. Mohammad Ali Riazi Kolahdozmahaleh has chaired the boards of several Sepehr-linked companies. Reports also identify Brigadier General Jamshid Eshaghi, head of the AFGS Office of Budget and Financial Affairs and a former Sepehr Energy official, as an overseer of Sepehr's operations.

Sepehr Energy controls or acts as the parent to multiple affiliated entities in Iran's oil industry. Notably, Sepehr Energy Hamta Pars, Sepehr Energy Jahan Nama Taban, and Sepehr Energy Paya Gostar Jahan are all described as sister companies that "share many of the same company officials" with Sepehr Energy. These affiliates facilitate commodity deals and oil shipments for the AFGS. For example, Sepehr Energy Jahan Nama Taban arranged the delivery of nearly two million barrels of crude to China in January 2025. All of these Sepehr-linked companies were sanctioned in early 2025 as entities "owned, controlled, or directed by" Sepehr Energy.

== Connections to Iran's armed forces ==
Sepehr Energy is explicitly tied to Iran's military command structure. U.S. officials note that the company "oversees [oil] activity for the AFGS" (Armed Forces General Staff). The AFGS, together with Iran's Ministry of Defense and Armed Forces Logistics (MODAFL), is the umbrella organization coordinating the country's conventional military budget and procurement. The U.S. Treasury's sanctions describe Sepehr Energy as a front for the MODAFL and AFGS, and its revenues are seen as funding for Iran's weapons programs and proxy networks. Indeed, U.S. sanctions documentation explicitly links Sepehr Energy to MODAFL, identifying the company on the Specially Designated Nationals (SDN) list with the remark "Linked To: Ministry of Defense and Armed Forces Logistics".

The company's financial and operational directives are understood to come from high-level Iranian military leaders. Brigadier General Eshaghi's direct oversight of Sepehr Energy exemplifies this chain of control. Moreover, Sepehr Energy's activities are framed as part of the AFGS's fiscal strategy. Press releases note that the AFGS allocates billions of barrels of oil to military entities annually, which these bodies then sell to finance their budgets. In this scheme, Sepehr Energy is the primary commercial arm channeling oil sales revenue to the AFGS and MODAFL. As one analysis observed, Sepehr Energy "acts as a front company for the Iranian government's oil sales," and U.S. authorities believe it "was instrumental in financing both the Iranian armed forces and the Revolutionary Guards".

== Sanctions designation and legal status ==
U.S. authorities have sanctioned Sepehr Energy and dozens of related individuals and entities under counterterrorism and Iran sanctions authorities. On November 29, 2023, the U.S. Department of the Treasury designated Sepehr Energy as a Specially Designated Global Terrorist (SDGT) under Executive Order 13224. The designation cited Sepehr's provision of material support to Iran's Ministry of Defense and Armed Forces Logistics. (MODAFL itself had been designated in 2019 for assisting the IRGC-Qods Force) Following the designation, Sepehr Energy's assets under U.S. jurisdiction were blocked, and U.S. persons are prohibited from dealing with the company. Additionally, these actions were reinforced by an executive order (E.O. 13902) targeting Iran's petroleum and petrochemical sectors, signed in late 2024, which explicitly applies sanctions to Sepehr Energy as part of the oil sector.

Subsequent actions in early 2025 broadened the sanctions network. On February 6, 2025, the U.S. imposed new sanctions on dozens of individuals, companies, and vessels involved in shipping Iranian oil to China for the benefit of Sepehr Energy and the AFGS . The State Department noted that this action targeted "an international network" moving illicit oil shipments to China that funded the AFGS through its front company Sepehr Energy. The Sanctions List Search (SDN List) entry confirms that Sepehr Energy is listed under the Iran sanctions regime (IFSR) and that it is "linked to" Iran's military logistics. In parallel, a Federal Register notice (OFAC release) identified numerous affiliated companies and individuals (most already blocked) as part of Sepehr's network.

== Sanctions evasion tactics and oil export methods ==
To evade sanctions, Sepehr Energy employs a sophisticated array of deceptive practices. The company orchestrates clandestine shipments using a "shadow fleet" of vessels, falsified documentation, and ship-to-ship transfers at sea, all designed to obscure the origin of Iranian oil. For example, the U.S. Treasury reported that Sepehr-affiliated tankers routinely turn off AIS transponders, change names or flags, and carry falsified certificates of origin. In one case, the Comoros-flagged tanker ANTHEA (IMO 9281683), renamed SIRI, was loaded with millions of barrels of Iranian crude bound for China. Sepehr's master of that vessel, Iranian national Arash Lavian, had the ship literally repainted and renamed mid-voyage to conceal its identity from authorities home.treasury.govdocs.house.gov.This tanker and others like ELSA (IMO 9256468), HEBE (IMO 9259185), and BOREAS (IMO 9248497) were noted to be part of Sepehr's fleet of vessels used to ship oil. In all, U.S. officials state that "millions of barrels of oil" reach overseas buyers through these covert operations.

A key enabler is the use of offshore entities and foreign partners that masquerade Iranian oil as foreign-origin. One documented scheme involved Hong Kong-based brokerage Puyuan Trade Co. selling Iranian condensate as if it were Malaysian, through a front company (HK Sihang Haochen Trading)home.treasury.gov. Similarly, Dubai-based traders such as Unique Performance General Trading LLC and OPG Global (acting for Sepehr) brokered sales of Iranian crude to buyers in China and Europe, re-labeling shipments en route. These and other commodity brokers (JEP Petrochemical, Future Energy, Tetis Global, Royal Shell, A Three Energy, etc.) have been specifically sanctioned for materially assisting Sepehr Energy. In practice, nearly all Sepehr's oil sales appear to involve layered front companies that obscure both the seller and origin, often routing payments through Iran-based "exchange houses" and front bank accounts. The Treasury notes that Sepehr "relies upon the services of Iranian exchange houses to transfer funds to MODAFL-controlled bank accounts". These exchange houses establish additional front companies abroad to receive payments, effectively sanitizing Iranian oil revenue for the military.

Another method is using Iran's state tanker company under cover: Sepehr Energy has arranged shipments via the National Iranian Tanker Company (NITC) as well. Although NITC itself was previously sanctioned (for supporting the IRGC-Qods Force), Sepehr's affiliates have found ways to load oil onto such vessels and then perform ship-to-ship transfers. For instance, OFAC identified the Panama-flagged tanker BESTLA (IMO 9295593) receiving 2 million barrels via a transfer from the Cameroon-flagged ATILA (formerly HECATE, IMO 9233753), a tanker previously sanctioned in 2024 for shipping Iranian oil in coordination with Sepehr Energy. The complex pattern is: oil is loaded under Iranian documentation, transferred to a second vessel at sea, and re-documented en route so that by the time it nears China or other destinations, it appears to be non-Iranian oil.

A recent example illustrates the scale of these tactics. In December 2024, Sepehr Energy and its executive Elyas Niroomand Toomaj loaded nearly two million barrels of Iranian heavy crude onto the Cameroon-flagged tanker OXIS (IMO 9224805), owned by Seychelles-based Miletus Line Ltd. Simultaneously, Sepehr used the Panama-flagged tanker GIOIOSA (IMO 9198082), owned by Hong Kong's Gozoso Group Ltd, to move over 700,000 barrels for delivery to China home.treasury.gov. Both ships employed foreign management companies, Ocean Dolphin (China/HK) managed GIOIOSA, and Kazakhstan-based Umbra Navi handled OXIS. Crucially, OXIS had already been implicated in prior oil-smuggling: it was sanctioned (via its manager Umbra Navi and its former name SALVIA) for prior ship-to-ship transfers of Russian-origin crude.

An investigative report by Iran International reveals, emails and documents, that a Tehran-based company, Sepehr Energy Jahannama Pars, allegedly operated as a front for the Iranian military to sell sanctioned oil to Asia. The company established a network of shell companies, including Sepehr Energy Paya Gostar Jahan and Sepehr Energy Hamta Pars, to mask military affiliations and facilitate these transactions. Despite denials from key individuals like Elyas Niroumand Toumaj, internal documents suggest direct ties to Iran's armed forces, including contracts and shipping documents indicating military guarantees for oil shipments.

To further obscure these links, the network reportedly used a Hong Kong-based proxy firm, Xin Rui Ji, which engaged in ship-to-ship transfers in Singaporean waters. Communications indicate that Xin Rui Ji sought buyers across Europe, China, and the Persian Gulf, including the Netherlands-based Gemini Group. Emails between Gemini and Sepehr representatives reveal awareness of the Iranian government's involvement and concerns over sanctions, yet also highlight ongoing collaboration and financial arrangements.

== Chinese oil trade and export routes ==
China is Sepehr Energy's primary market. Under the "maximum pressure" policy, the U.S. has singled out the China shipments as key targets. The Iranian military allocates a large share of its crude output to sales in Asia, with most of it going to China at steep discounts reuters.com. To reach Chinese refineries, Sepehr's vessels often deliver oil in or near China in covert ways. U.S. officials have confirmed that the millions of barrels mentioned above (on OXIS, GIOIOSA, and SIRI) were bound for Chinese buyers. In practice, the export route typically works as follows: an Iran-origin cargo is loaded, sent near China, then taken on by another tanker, passed via ship-to-ship transfer, and finally delivered so that it "re-enters" China under a false flag of origin.

Chinese intermediaries are also involved. For example, in late 2024 the U.S. sanctioned Shandong Shengxing Chemical Co., an independent "teapot" refinery that had taken dozens of shipments of Iranian oil worth over $1 billion. That and similar buyers have stored Iranian crude and/or paid the required fees to the tank operators in Dalian and Zhoushan. Notably, China holds roughly 25 million barrels of Iranian oil in leased storage tanks from pre-2019 transactions. To recover these reserves after U.S. waivers ended, Iranian officials have worked with China to sell them surreptitiously. In January 2025, media reported that two tankers , the Madestar and the CH Billion, were sent to China's Dalian port to load such stored Iranian oil. Madestar reportedly left China carrying 2 million barrels, and CH Billion remained docked with 700,000 barrels. These oil sales were handled covertly so that by the time the oil left Chinese ports it would be mislabeled as coming from elsewhere iranintl.com. Analysts note that this whole process requires transfers and document alterations to disguise the Iranian origin iranintl.comreuters.com. Sepehr Energy's China trade combines on-shore storage transfers (from facilities in Dalian/Zhoushan) with the shadow fleet at sea. The sanctioned network has explicitly targeted both aspects: Treasury actions have named the vessels and their owners (e.g. Miletus Line, Gozoso Group, Ocean Dolphin, Umbra Navi) involved in recent China-bound shipments. Moreover, U.S. sanctions have hit key service providers, including the BESTLA Company Limited (owner of the BESTLA tanker) and management firms like Dexiang Shipping (HK) , all because these ships carried Iranian oil toward China.

== Affiliates, front companies, and network partners ==
Beyond its own subsidiaries, Sepehr Energy depends on a wide array of front companies and brokers. These include Iranian firms, regional trading companies, and shipping firms, many now sanctioned. Key Sepehr-affiliated entities include:

- Sepehr Energy Hamta Pars: An Iranian oil trading affiliate (Managing Director: Farshad Ghazi) active in petroleum sales.
- Sepehr Energy Jahan Nama Taban: Anaffiliate that arranged major oil shipments (e.g. the ~2 million barrel January 2025 consignment).
- Sepehr Energy Paya Gostar Jahan: Affiliate (Chairman: Farbod Mohseni Ahari) with similar functions in arranging exports.

Other Iran-based partners include Pishro Tejarat Sana Co., which works on behalf of Sepehr to "facilitate the sale and shipment of commodities to overseas buyers" and shares profits. Its chairman, Seyyed Abdoljavad Alavi, was sanctioned alongside Sepehr in 2023 for providing material support to Iran's military. Additionally, a network of Iranian currency exchange houses is used to funnel petro-revenues to military-controlled bank accounts, effectively acting as a shadow banking network for Sepehr Energy.

Internationally, numerous middlemen enable Sepehr's trades. U.S. sanction documents list dozens of broker-traders and service providers: for example, Hong Kong-based Puyuan Trade Co. Ltd. and HK Sihang Haochen Trading Ltd., which handled tens of millions of dollars of condensate sales for Sepehr. In the UAE, Dubai companies like Unique Performance General Trading L.L.C., OPG Global General Trading Co. L.L.C., JEP Petrochemical Trading L.L.C., and Future Energy Trading L.L.C. were identified as Sepehr's purchasers of oil (amounting to millions of barrels) for delivery to China and Europe. Warehousing these deals, Sharjah-based brokers Tetis Global FZE, Royal Shell Goods Wholesalers L.L.C., and Dubai's A Three Energy FZE were named as enablers of Sepehr's commodity sales. All of these commercial intermediaries were sanctioned in early 2024-2025 as having "materially assisted, sponsored, or provided goods or services to" Sepehr Energy.

On the maritime side, Sepehr's network relies on foreign shipping lines and managers. U.S. sanctions list includes:

- Gozoso Group Ltd. (Hong Kong): Owner of the Panama-flagged tanker GIOIOSA home.treasury.gov.
- Miletus Line Ltd. (Seychelles): Owner of the Cameroon-flagged tanker OXIShome.treasury.gov.
- Ocean Dolphin Ship Management Ltd. (China/Hong Kong) – Provided management services for GIOIOSA.
- Umbra Navi Ship Management Corp. (Kazakhstan): Technical manager of OXIS.
- Marshal Ship Management Pvt. Ltd. (India): Provided crew for Sepehr's vessels (including SIRI, ELSA, HEBE, BOREAS) and is thus accused of facilitating document falsification.

Additional transport-related entities include Lucky Ocean Shipping Ltd. (Marshall Islands) and Young Folks International Trading Co. Ltd. (Hong Kong), both designated for involvement in Iran's petroleum tradereuters.com. Oceanic Orbit Inc. (Panama), Dexiang Shipping Co. (Hong Kong), Bestla Company Limited (Marshall Islands), and Civic Capital Shipping Inc. (Panama) have been identified as owning or operating specific tankers used in these operations.

Sepehr Energy's network extends to numerous people. In addition to the corporate leaders noted earlier, the U.S. has sanctioned several individuals for working on Sepehr's behalf. These include Elyas Niroomand Toomaj, a Sepehr executive who arranged oil trades and shipments (he orchestrated the December 2024 dispatch of OXIS to China), and Arash Lavian, who captained the tanker SIRI and actively concealed its identity. Ryan Xavier Aranha, an Indian national serving as a director of Marshal Ship Management, was designated for facilitating Sepehr's operations. Several Sepehr board members and officials ( Alavi, Ahari, Riazi Kolahdozmahaleh) were also added to sanctions lists as supporters of Iran's military.

On the foreign side, key partners include the Chinese "teapot" refinery Shandong Shengxing (sanctioned for buying over $1 billion of Iranian crude). India-based crew managers like Marshal Ship are pivotal enablers (as noted), and even shell companies in jurisdictions like Seychelles, Hong Kong, and the UAE serve as financial conduits. For example, Oceanic Orbit Inc. (Panama) and Pro Mission Sdn Bhd (Malaysia) were designated in the same cycle as having provided technical support via their control of certain tanker operations. Each of these actors, whether crew managers, shipping firms, or trading partners, is now under sanctions for its role in the Sepehr network.

== Global sanctions enforcement and impact ==
The international response to Sepehr Energy's network has been multi-faceted. Besides U.S. actions, other governments and entities have taken notice. The Treasury's coordinated sanctions in 2023–2025 represent the most targeted pressure yet on Iran's military oil trade. They effectively place every major conduit into the U.S. SDN regime. This includes not only Sepehr Energy itself, but also its parent (MODAFL), its subsidiary companies, trading houses, brokerage firms, and the vessels they use. For instance, at least seven tankers linked to Sepehr (ELSA, HEBE, BOREAS, OXIS, GIOIOSA, SIRI/ANTHEA, BESTLA) have been sanctioned. Each sanction carries a provision to "block" the vessel (designating it as blocked property).

Media accounts underscore the broader strategic intent. Reuters noted that these actions send a warning not only to Iran but to Chinese entities involved in its oil trade. U.S. officials explicitly warned Chinese importers of risk, and intelligence reports (e.g. UANI testimony) make clear that Sepehr's methods, such as mid-voyage repainting, have become standard practice for Iran's export "ghost fleet".

== See also ==
- Persian Gulf Star Oil Company (PGSOC)
- Clearstream
