= Jey Oil Refining Company =

Iranian bitumen manufacturer

Jey Oil Refinery Company
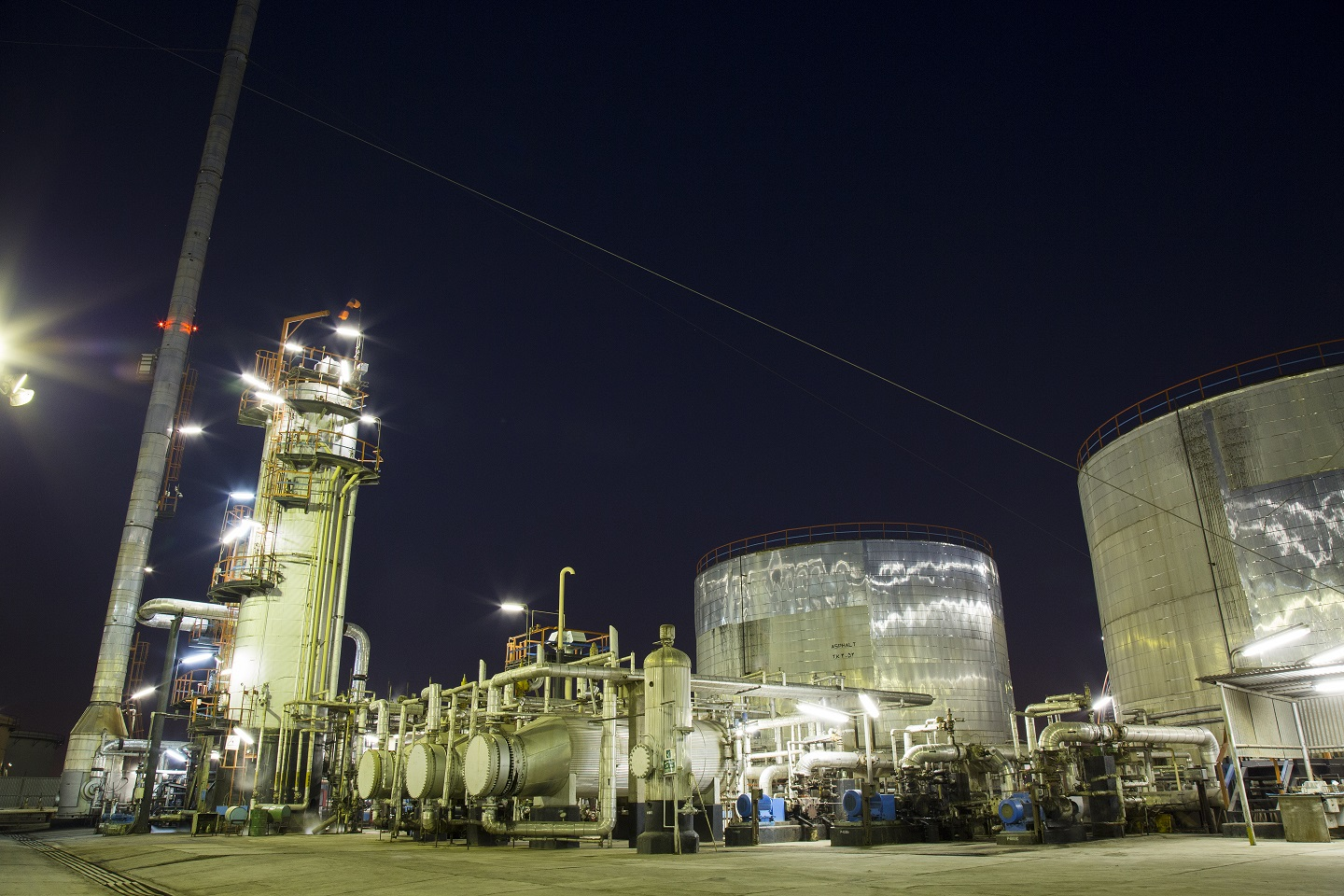
- Jey Oil Refining Company site located in Isfahan at night
- Type: Public stock, Public Company
- Industry: Oil, Betumen
- Founded: 2003; 23 years ago
- Headquarters: Tehran, Iran
- Key people: Majid Azami (CEO) Mehdi Sanaee Far (COO) Behzad Poorahmadi (Member of the Board) MohammadReza Sadri Esfahani (Member of the Board) Hadi Amirshaghaghi (Member of the Board)
- Products: Bitumen
- Parent: Naftiran Intertrade
- Subsidiaries: Hamyar Jey Co.- Milad Co.-Asia Gostar Co.-Jey Corner Pars Co.-Azad Chemical Co.
- Website: jeyoil.com/en

The Oil Refinery Jey or the Oil Refining Company Jey has been established in 2003; with the investment of Oil Industry Personnel Pension Fund, with a nominal capacity of 1,800,000 tons as the largest producer of bituminous units in the Middle East.

== Background ==
The company has two production and storage sites in Isfahan and Bandar Abbas and the head office in Tehran. Isfahan site has 4 separate units for the production of blown bitumen, with a nominal capacity of 40,000 barrels per day, a bottoms of 7100 barrels per day and emulsion bitumen with a capacity of 200 tons per day. This site is a separate unit for the production of polymeric and modified bitumen with a capacity of 100,000 tons annually. G-Petroleum Laboratory is the most well-equipped industrial bitumen laboratory in the country and region, and has been recognized as the first International Accreditation Lab with 17025 Standard Certificate since 2007; The laboratory as a supplier of testing the results for various types of bitumen and associates of different inspection companies, which are including of SGS and Atlas in the region and also in the Bandar Abbas import and export terminals for various delivery services, all were launched in 1395 (2015). The complex consists of 8 tank units with a capacity of 3000 tons (total storage capacity of 24,000 tons), is designed, manufactured and operated on the basis of the international standards of ASTM, IPS, API and NFPA20.

== See also ==
- Industry of Iran
- Privatization in Iran
- List of Iranian companies
- National Iranian Oil Company
- Privatization in Iran
- List of Iranian companies
- National Iranian Oil Company
- Isfahan Oil Refinery
- Pasargad Oil Company
- Majid Azami
- Persian Gulf Star Oil Company (PGSOC)
