= Jamshid Eshaghi =

Iranian brigadier general (1961–2026)

Sardar Jamshid Eshaghi
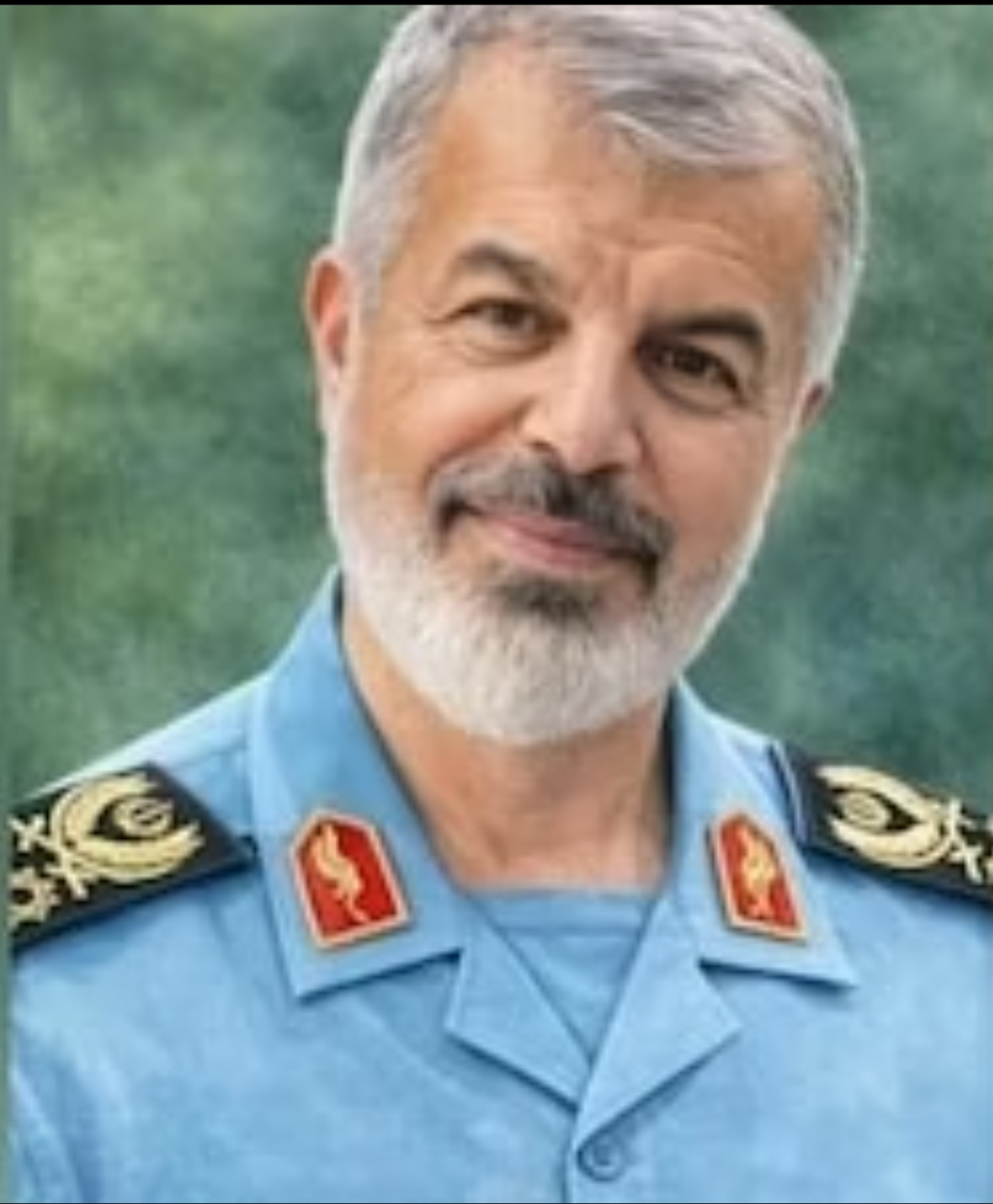
- Eshaghi in an undated photo
- Born: 7 July 1961; Ahvaz, Pahlavi Iran
- Died: 31 March 2026 (aged 64) Tehran, Iran
- Cause of death: Airstrike
- Allegiance: Iran
- Branch: Islamic Revolutionary Guard Corps
- Service years: 1980s–2026
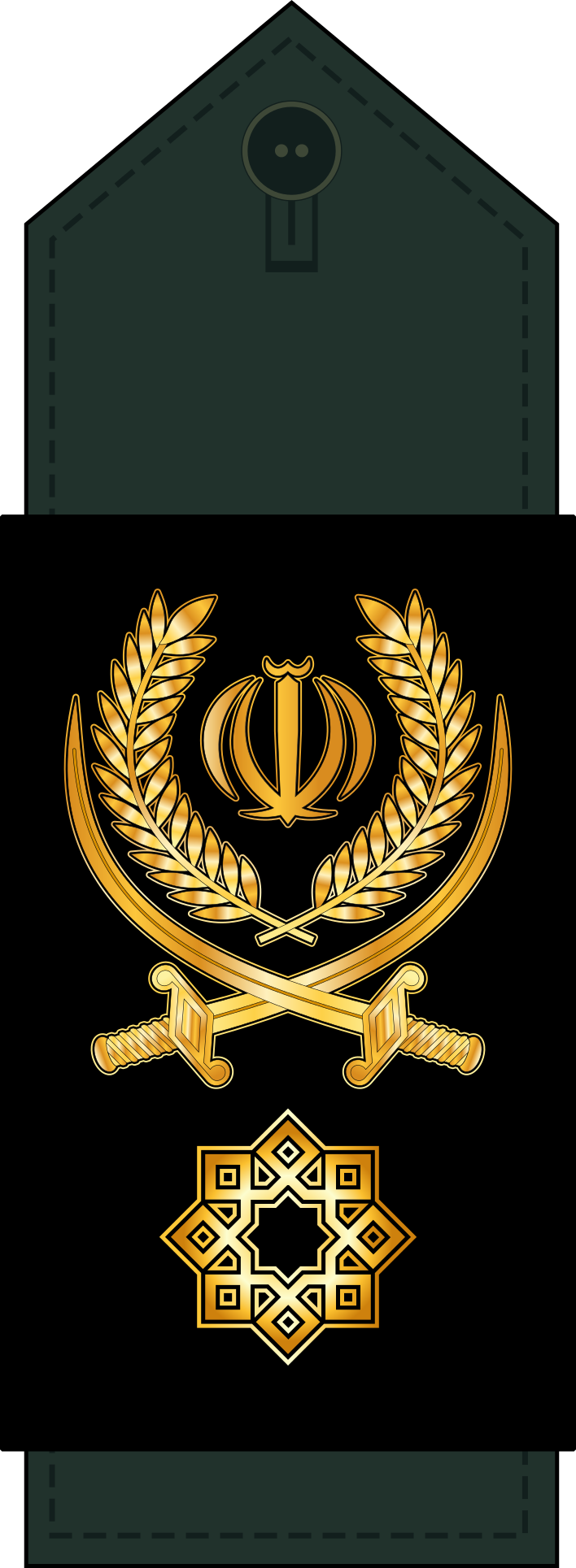
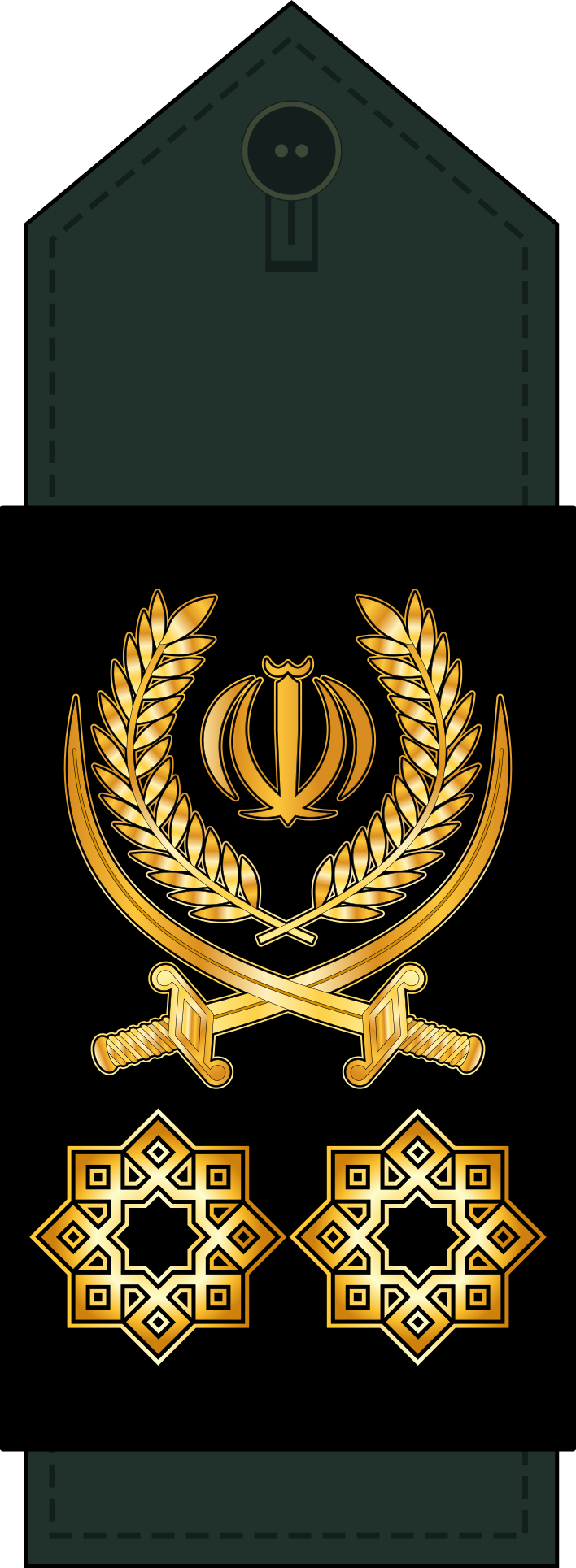
- Rank: Brigadier General; Major General (posthumously)
- Commands: Chief of the Office of Budget and Financial Affairs of the Armed Forces General Staff (?–2026)
- Conflicts: Iran–Iraq War; Twelve-Day War; 2026 Iran war †

Jamshid Eshaghi (Persian: جمشید اسحاقی; 7 July 1961 – 31 March 2026) was an Iranian Brigadier general. He served as Chief of the Office of Budget and Financial Affairs within the Armed Forces General Staff (AFGS), the top command coordinating the nation's military branches.

In this role, Eshaghi was responsible for managing military finances and budgets, which in Iran has at times involved allocating crude oil directly to the armed forces in lieu of cash funding, enabling military entities to sell the oil to finance their operations. As a high-ranking official, roughly equivalent to a deputy planning director within the General Staff, Eshaghi was among the most senior Iranian figures targeted by international sanctions, including U.S. Treasury sanctions imposed in February 2025. He was killed in an Israeli airstrike during the 2026 Iran war.

== Background ==
Eshaghi was born in Ahvaz, Iran on 7 July 1961.

== Involvement with Sepehr Energy and affiliates ==
Eshaghi was closely linked to Sepehr Energy Jahan Nama Pars, a Tehran-based oil company identified by U.S. officials as a front for Iran's military. In fact, Sepehr Energy is described as a cover company operating on behalf of the AFGS and Iran's Ministry of Defense (MODAFL) to covertly sell Iranian oil abroad. Brigadier General Eshaghi once served as an official of Sepehr Energy and was said to have directly overseen its operations for the armed forces. An investigative report by Iran International revealed that Sepehr Energy established a network of shell companies, including subsidiaries like Sepehr Energy Hamta Pars, Sepehr Energy Jahan Nama Taban, and Sepehr Energy Paya Gostar Jahan, to mask the military's role in oil deals. These affiliates facilitated shipments of Iranian crude oil to buyers in Asia while sharing many of the same personnel with Sepehr Energy. For example, one Sepehr affiliate arranged the delivery of nearly two million barrels of Iranian crude oil to China in January 2025 alone. Internal documents and communications (exposed via Iran International) have indicated direct ties between Sepehr Energy's dealings and Iran's armed forces, including contracts bearing military guarantees for oil shipments, despite public denials by company officials.

== Ties to the IRGC and oil sale operations ==
Eshaghi's activities in Sepehr's oil network brought him into cooperation with the Islamic Revolutionary Guard Corps (IRGC), especially in illicit crude sales to China. According to the U.S. Treasury, Brig. Gen. Eshaghi coordinated with the IRGC on the sale of Iranian crude oil to the People's Republic of China. The IRGC has itself taken an expanding role in Iran's oil exports. A late-2024 investigation by Reuters reported that the IRGC had "tightened their grip" on the country's oil industry, secretly controlling up to 50% of Iran's oil exports through shadow tankers, logistics networks, and front companies (many selling oil at steep discounts to Chinese buyers). This oil-smuggling enterprise, originally established years ago under IRGC Quds Force commanders, has become a major source of revenue used to fund Iran's military projects and proxy forces. Eshaghi's role, liaising between the AFGS (and by extension the conventional military) and the IRGC's clandestine oil trade, positioned him as a crucial facilitator in monetizing Iranian oil outside of official channels. Eshaghi helped to integrate the armed forces' budgetary needs with the IRGC's covert export network, ensuring proceeds from "off-the-books" oil sales reached Iran's defense institutions.

== International sanctions and designations ==
Eshaghi's involvement in these activities led to his designation under international sanctions, principally by the United States. On 6 February 2025, the U.S. Department of the Treasury's Office of Foreign Assets Control (OFAC) sanctioned Eshaghi as part of a major action against an Iranian oil-smuggling network. He was blacklisted alongside several other persons and entities linked to Sepehr Energy, with OFAC citing that Eshaghi had "acted or purported to act for or on behalf of, directly or indirectly, Sepehr Energy". This designation was made under the U.S. counterterrorism authority Executive Order 13224, effectively categorizing him as a Specially Designated Global Terrorist (SDGT) due to the financial support his activities provide to IRGC-linked terrorism and militant groups. Notably, Iran's IRGC and its Quds Force are themselves U.S.-designated terrorist organizations, which is why facilitating their oil revenue can trigger a terrorism-based sanction. The U.S. also referenced Executive Order 13902 in Eshaghi's designation, an authority targeting Iran's petroleum sector.

Under these sanctions, any of Eshaghi's assets under U.S. jurisdiction were frozen, and U.S. persons (including banks) are prohibited from doing business with him. Moreover, OFAC assigned Eshaghi a "secondary sanctions risk" warning. This means that foreign (non-U.S.) institutions that knowingly facilitate significant transactions for him could themselves face U.S. sanctions, a powerful disincentive for international companies and banks to have any dealings involving Eshaghi or his associated entities. In practical terms, Eshaghi had been cut off from the formal global financial system: he could not travel freely to many countries, open bank accounts abroad, or engage in cross-border trade without risking asset seizures or enforcement actions. The U.S. Treasury press release announcing the move emphasized that Iran's armed forces, through fronts like Sepehr, generate "hundreds of millions of dollars" from oil sales to fund destabilizing activities (from missile development to regional militias), and that Washington is committed to disrupting these revenue streams. Indeed, U.S. officials pointed out that the oil shipments coordinated by Eshaghi and others were conducted on behalf of the AFGS and were funneling money into Iran's military expansion.

European Union authorities and the United Nations had not publicly listed Eshaghi for sanctions. The European Union has sanctioned various IRGC- and MODAFL-linked entities over the years (especially related to Iran's nuclear program and regional aggression), but Eshaghi's name does not appear in EU sanction documents to date. Nonetheless, the U.S. measures, given their extraterritorial reach, significantly limit Eshaghi's international dealings. Regional media outlets have widely covered the case; for instance, Iran's state-affiliated press condemned the U.S. sanctions as "illegitimate and unlawful" even as opposition-run media highlighted Eshaghi as the highest-ranking Iranian officer hit in that sanctions round. Western news services like Reuters and Al Jazeera framed the sanctions against Eshaghi and the Sepehr network as part of President Donald Trump's renewed "maximum pressure" campaign upon returning to office, aimed at cutting Iran's oil exports to zero and curbing funds for its missile and nuclear programs.

== Death ==
On 31 March 2026, the Islamic Revolutionary Guard Corps confirmed that Jamshid Eshaghi had been killed in an Israeli airstrike during the 2026 Iran war.

== See also ==
- List of Iranian officials killed during the 2026 Iran war
- Majid Azami
- Sepehr Energy Jahan
- Islamic Revolutionary Guard Corps
- Persian Gulf Star Oil Company
- National Iranian Oil Company
