= Majid Azami =

Iranian oil executive (born 1983)

Majid A'zami
- مجید اعظمی

Personal details
- Born: 1983 (age 42–43) Esfahan, Iran

Majid A'zami (مجید اعظمی; born January 6, 1983, in Esfahan, Iran) is an Iranian oil executive and businessman associated with the country's refining sector, including senior roles in state-linked and semi-government oil companies. He was designated under US sanctions in 2023 in connection with alleged involvement in oil sales linked to Iranian military financing.

== Professional background ==
Azami is a veteran Iranian oil executive. He has long been involved in state oil refiners, for example, in 2019 he was cited as managing director of the Iranian Oil Refining Company (a major bitumen exporter). In 2018 he was identified as a senior official at the Jey Oil Refining Company. Investigative profiles note that Azami has led multiple semi-government refineries (in Tehran and Isfahan) for years.

== Sanctions and legal status ==
Azami has been listed under U.S. sanctions as of November 29, 2023, (Executive Order 13224), which were targeting individuals and networks allegedly involved in financing Iranian military activities through oil sales. These networks have been linked to companies such as Sepehr Energy, of which Azami was deputy chairman, principal board member, and managing director at the time of the sanctions. While the U.S. Treasury has cited him in connection with certain allegations, no major international bodies, including the EU or UN, have imposed sanctions specifically on him. Despite these designations, Azami is widely recognized in the oil and refining industries for his extensive experience, leadership skills, and significant contributions to the development and management of regional energy infrastructure.

== International dealings and influence ==
Azami is well-known in the Persian Gulf oil industry, particularly for his extensive experience in the sale of bitumen and the management of various refineries. During his tenure as CEO of Jey Oil Refining Company, he successfully transformed the refinery into the largest bitumen production facility in the Middle East.

== See also ==
- National Iranian Oil Company
- Persian Gulf Star Oil Company
