= Port of Dalian =

Port of Dalian 大连港
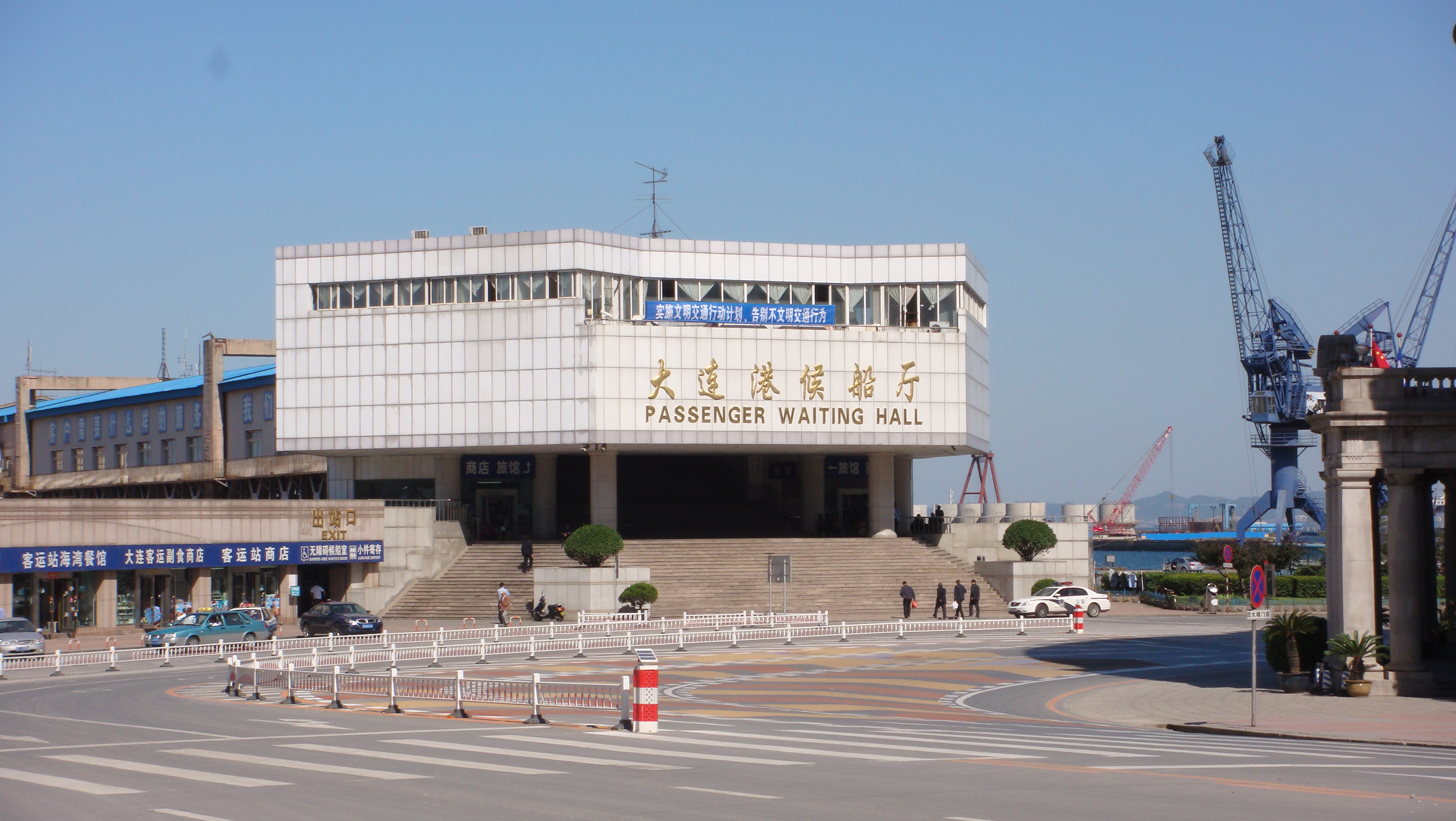
- Interactive map of Port of Dalian 大连港

Location
- Country: China
- Location: Dalian, Liaoning

Details
- Opened: 1899
- Owned by: Dalian Port Corporation Limited

Port of Dalian
- Simplified Chinese: 大连港
- Traditional Chinese: 大連港
Transcriptions
Standard Mandarin
- Hanyu Pinyin: Dàlián Gǎng
- Wade–Giles: Daai Lìhn Góng

The Port of Dalian (38° 56' N 121° 39' E) founded in 1899 lies at the southern tip of Liaodong Peninsula in Liaoning province and is the most northern ice-free port in China. It is also the largest multi-purpose port in Northeast China serving the seaports North Asia, East Asia and the Pacific Rim. It is the trade gateway to the Pacific. It is the second largest container transshipment hub in mainland China and the city of Dalian is categorized as a Large-Port Metropolis using the Southampton system for port-city classification.

== Overview ==
In 1972, the first container ships entered the Port of Dalian, and inaugurated China's first container routes. In 1973, the port handled 21.5 million tons.

The Port of Dalian consists of Daliangang, Dalianwan, Xianglujiao, Nianyuwan, Ganjinzi, Heizuizi, Si'ergou and Dayaowan port areas. Port of Dalian is owned and managed by the state-owned Dalian Port Corporation Limited. It has established trading and shipping links with more than 300 ports in 160 countries and regions of the world. There are 68 international and domestic container shipping routes. Port of Dalian handles at least 100 million in cargo throughput annually.

In May 2010, the port was visited by North Korean Supreme Leader Kim Jong-il, as part of a series of tours given to Kim by the Chinese government to promote an economic liberalization along the lines of China's reform and opening up in North Korea.

In 2016, it was confirmed that the Port of Dalian would be part of the port sector consolidation undertaken by the Chinese government. Previously, the Dalian Container Terminal (DCT) controlled operations at seven container berths while the Dalian Port Container Terminal (DPCT) operated five container berths and the Dalian International Container Terminal operated two. In August 2017, all entities merged to form one operating entity under the DCT. All three of the previous entities had varying degrees of international investment including Nippon Yusen (Japan), Singapore Dalian Port Investment and PSA China.

In early 2017, it was reported that the Dalian Port and Yingkou Port Group would enter into a 'corporation framework agreement' to integrate port management in Liaoning province. The province would form a new company to run all ports with state-owned China Merchants Group to purchase a controlling stake.

== Geography ==
The Port of Dalian is located on the Yellow Sea at 38°55′44″N and 121°39′17″. The port covers a water area of 346 square kilometres (134 mi^{2}) and a land area of nearly 15 square kilometres (5.8 mi^{2}). There are 160 kilometres (99 mi) of specialized railway lines, 300 square kilometres (120 mi^{2}) of warehousing, 1,800 square kilometres (690 mi^{2}) of stacking yards and over 1,000 units of different types of loading and discharging machinery and equipment.

== Port infrastructure ==
The port has 80 modern berths in production. Out these 38 are deep water berths for vessels of over 10,000 tonnes deadweight (DWT). The annual throughput was 64.17 million tons in 1995.

In 2016, cargo throughput for the Port of Dalian reached 355 million tons, which was up 5.5% from 2015.

== Port water depth and lifting capacities ==
Lifting capabilities are between 3 and 120 tons at working radii of 3 metres (9.8 ft) to 30 metres (98 ft). The Port of Dalian's DCT, DPCM, and DICT have a total of 13 berths with alongside depths from 9.8 metres (32 ft) to 16 metres (52 ft).

== Distance sailing time ==
The port is around 503.55 nautical miles (932.57 km), from Geoje, South Korea. The sailing time is an estimated 1 day at sea.

== Gallery ==
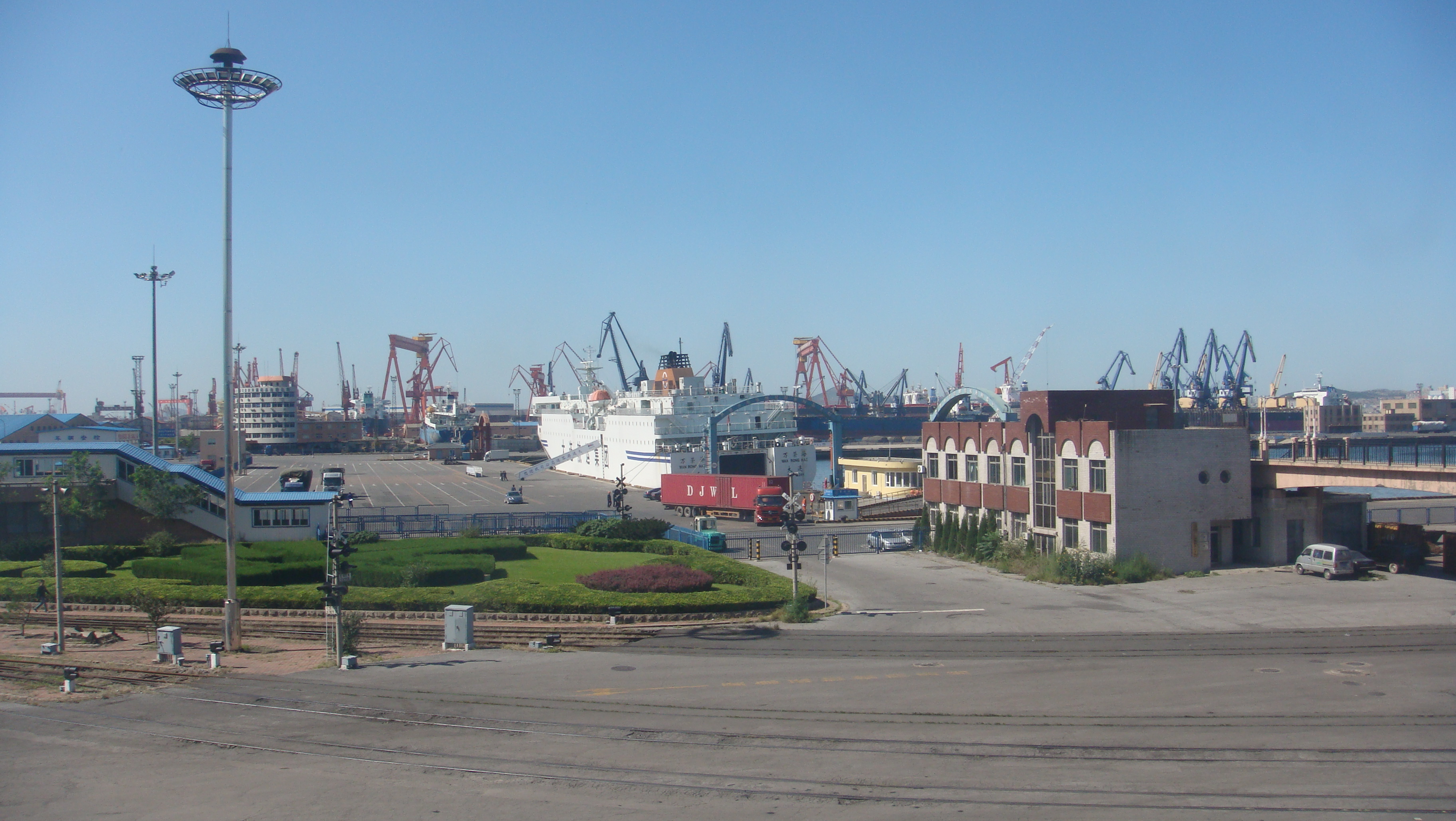

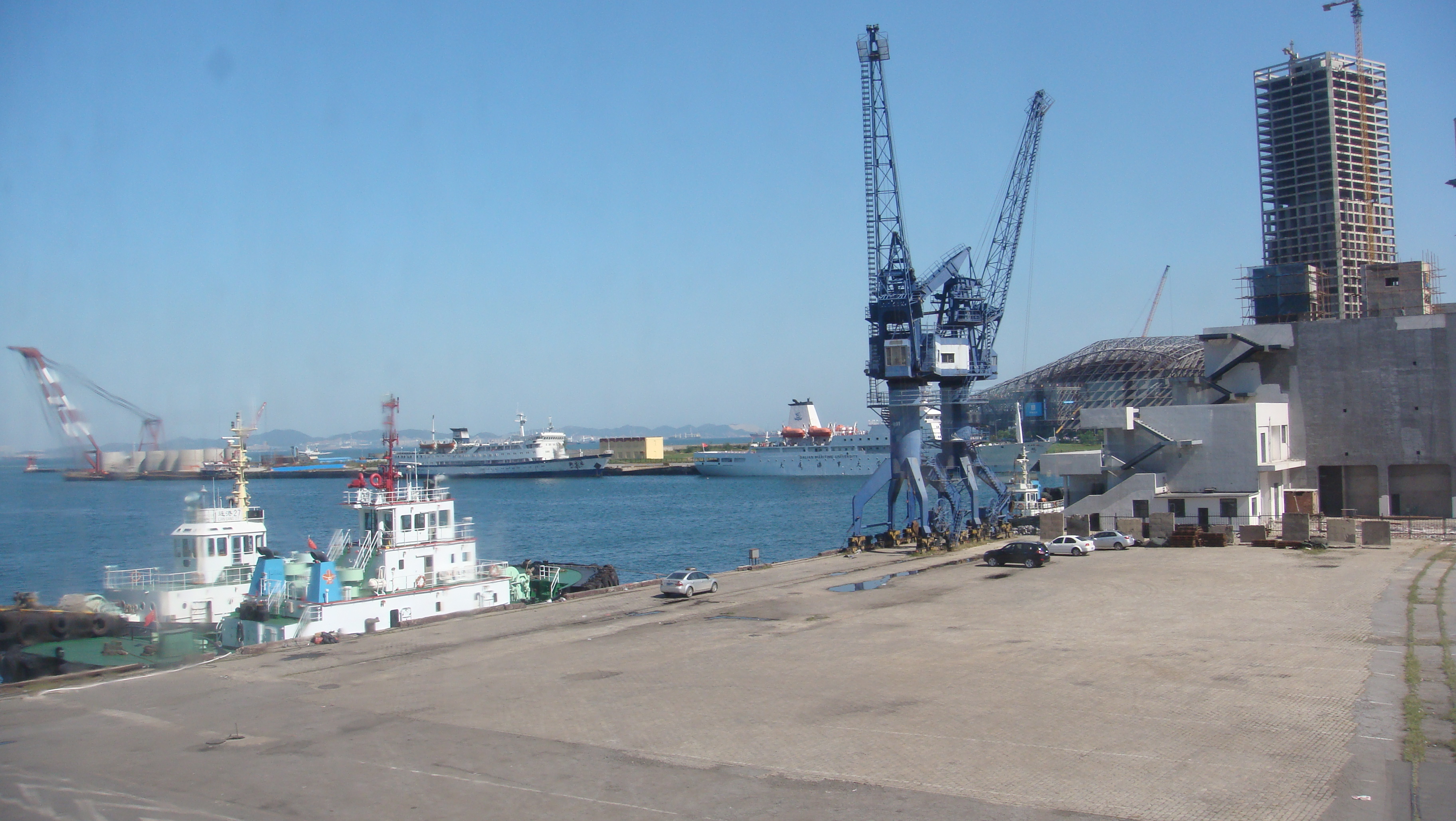

== See also ==
- Dalian Port (PDA) Company
