= End-face mechanical seal =

Seal made by two rotating parts pressed together at their end faces

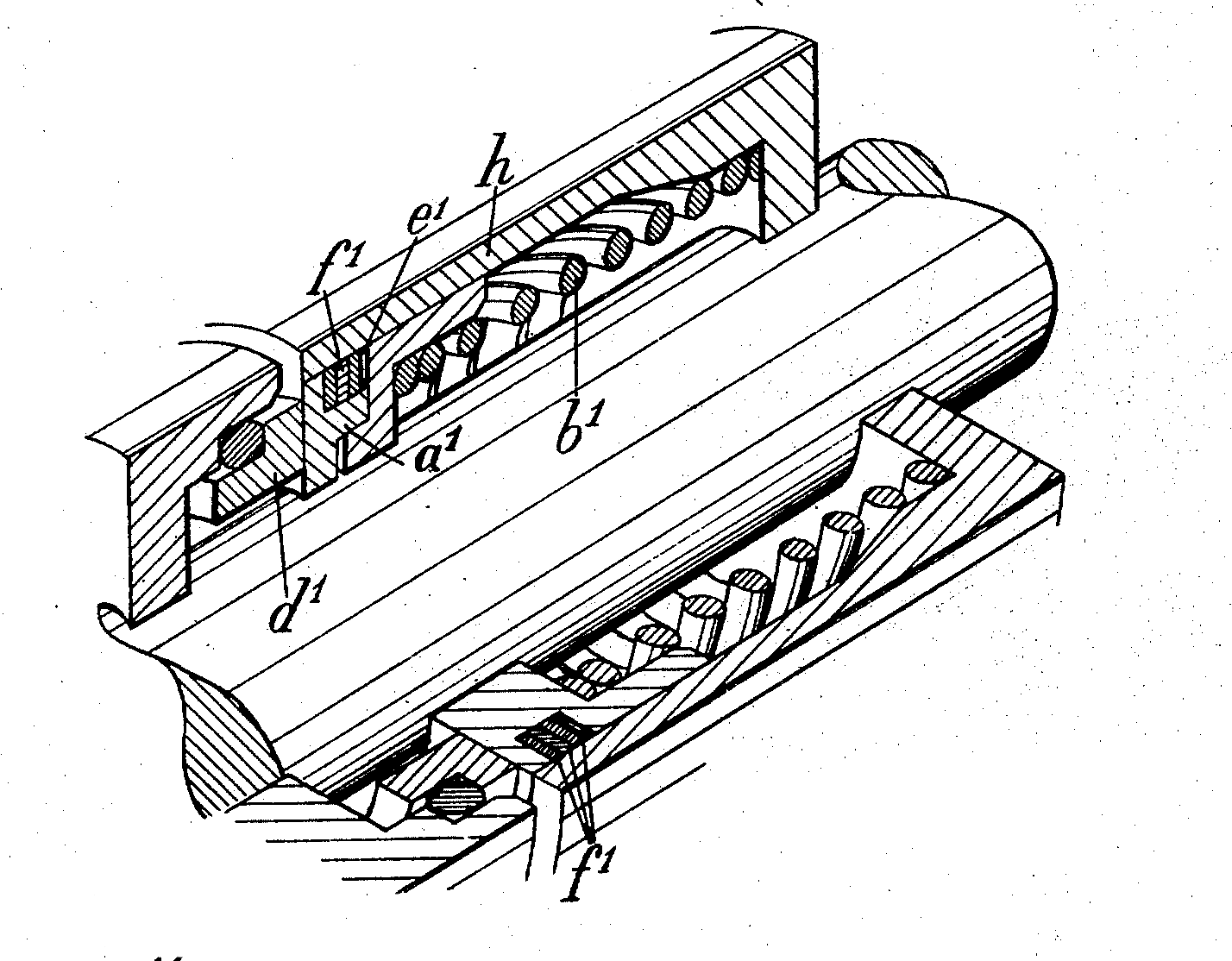
Elements d^{1} and a^{1} bear and slide on each other, creating a seal at their interface. One group of parts is connected to the rotating shaft and the other to the machine's case. The spring keeps the elements tight against each other, maintaining the seal and allowing for wear.

In mechanical engineering, an end-face mechanical seal (often shortened to mechanical seal) is a type of seal used in rotating equipment, such as pumps, mixers, blowers, and compressors. When a pump operates, the liquid could leak out of the pump between the rotating shaft and the stationary pump casing. Since the shaft rotates, preventing this leakage can be difficult. Earlier pump models used mechanical packing (otherwise known as gland packing) to seal the shaft. Since World War II, mechanical seals have replaced packing in many applications.

An end-face mechanical seal uses both rigid and flexible elements that maintain contact at a sealing interface and slide on each other, allowing a rotating element to pass through a sealed case. The elements are both hydraulically and mechanically loaded with a spring or other device to maintain contact. For similar designs using flexible elements, see radial shaft seal (or "lip seal") and O-ring.

== Mechanical seal fundamentals ==
An end-face mechanical seal consists of rotating and stationary components which are tightly pressed together using both mechanical and hydraulic forces. Even though these components are tightly pressed together, a small amount of leakage occurs through a clearance that is related to the surface roughness.

=== Components ===
All end-face mechanical seals have rotating elements, stationary elements, and include five basic components:

- seal ring
- mating ring
- secondary sealing elements
- springs
- Encasing

The seal ring and mating ring are sometimes referred to as the primary sealing surfaces. The primary sealing surfaces are the heart of the end-face mechanical seal. A common material combination for the primary sealing surfaces is a hard material, such as silicon carbide, ceramic or tungsten carbide and a softer material, such as carbon. Many other materials can be used depending on pressure, temperature and the chemical properties of the liquid being sealed. The seal ring and mating ring are in intimate contact, one ring rotates with the shaft and the other ring is stationary. Either ring may be rotating or stationary. Also, either ring may be made of hard or soft material. These two rings are machined using a process called lapping in order to obtain the necessary degree of surface finish and flatness. The seal ring is flexible in the axial direction; the mating ring is not flexible.

==== Seal ring ====
By definition, the seal ring is the axially flexible member of the end-face mechanical seal. The design of the seal ring must allow for minimizing distortion and maximizing heat transfer while considering the secondary sealing element, drive mechanism, spring and ease of assembly. Many seal rings contain the seal face diameters, although this is not a requirement of the primary ring. The seal ring always contains the balance diameter.

The shape of the seal ring may vary considerably according to the incorporation of various design features. In fact, the shape of the seal ring is often the most distinct identifying characteristic of a seal.

==== Mating ring ====
By definition, the mating ring is the non-flexible member of the mechanical seal. The design of the mating ring must allow for minimizing distortion and maximizing heat transfer while considering ease of assembly and the static secondary sealing element. The mating ring can contain the seal face diameters, although this is not a requirement of the mating ring. To minimize primary ring motion, the mating ring must be mounted solidly and should form a perpendicular plane for the primary ring to run against. Like seal rings, mating rings are available in many different shapes.

==== Secondary sealing elements ====
Secondary sealing elements are gaskets which provide sealing between the seal ring and shaft (or housing) and the mating ring and shaft (or housing). Typical secondary sealing elements include O-rings, wedges or rubber diaphragms. The secondary sealing elements (there may be a number of them) are not rotating relative to one another. The secondary sealing element for the mating ring is always static axially (although it may be rotating). Secondary sealing elements for the seal ring are described as being either pusher or non-pusher in the axial direction. The term pusher is applied to secondary seals that must be pushed back and forth by the movement of the shaft or primary ring whereas non-pusher secondary seals are static and associated with bellows seal rings.

==== Springs ====
In order to keep the primary sealing surfaces in intimate contact, an actuating force is required. This actuating force is provided by a spring. In conjunction with the spring, axial forces may also be provided by the pressure of the sealed fluid acting on the seal ring. Many different types of springs are used in mechanical seals: single spring, multiple springs, wave springs, and metal bellows.

==== Encasing ====
The term "Encasing" is used to describe various devices which hold the other components together in the desired relationship. For example, a retainer might be used to package the seal ring, secondary sealing element and springs into a single unit. Another example of encasing is the drive mechanism which is necessary to prevent axial and rotational slippage of the seal on the shaft.

== Classifications ==
There are a number of different ways in which “seals” may be classified. Sometimes a reference to a “seal” may be to a sealing system whereas other times the reference is to a device such as a gasket, an O-ring, compression packing, etc. In this article, the reference is to an end-face mechanical seal.

One such method of classification considers design features or the configuration in which these features may be used. Classification by Design accounts for the details and features incorporated into a single seal ring/mating ring pair. Classification by Configuration includes the orientation and combination of the seal ring/mating ring pair.

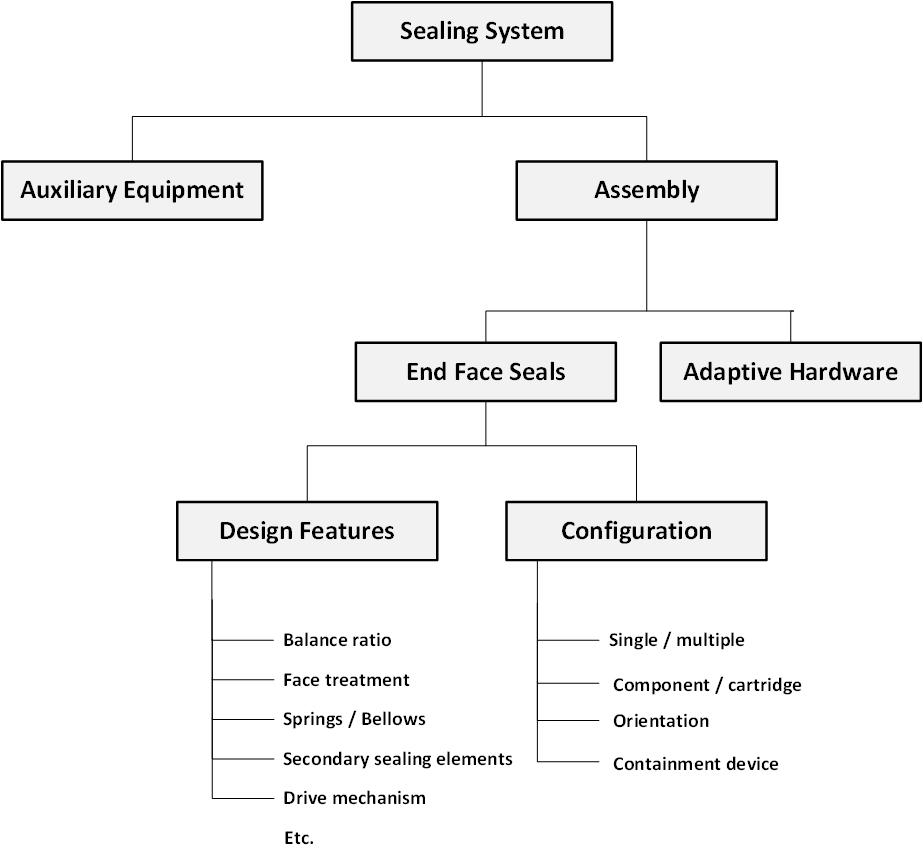
Classification of mechanical seals

=== Design features ===
The individual components of end-face mechanical seals may be designed to include features such as:

- face treatments such as hydrodynamic features, pads, etc.
- balance ratio
- pusher or bellows
- spring design
- hardware for containing assembly and providing drive mechanism
- considerations for secondary sealing element.

In general, design features are not completely independent; that is, emphasis of a particular feature may also influence other features. For example, selection of a particular secondary sealing element may influence the shape of the seal ring.

==== Face treatment ====
The most common seal face design is a plain, flat, smooth surface but there are many special treatments intended for specific applications. The most common objective for the face treatment is to reduce the magnitude of mechanical contact. In general, face treatments provide a means of modifying the pressure distribution between the seal faces through hydrostatic or hydrodynamic topography. Seal face topography refers to the three dimensional aspects of the seal face surface.

==== Balance ratio ====
In addition to the spring force, the seal faces are pushed together through pressure acting hydrostatically on the geometry of the seal. The ratio of the geometric area tending to close the seal faces to the area tending to open the seal faces is called the balance ratio.

==== Pusher or bellows seal ring ====
Pusher seals employ a dynamic secondary sealing element (typically an O-ring) which moves axially with the seal ring. Bellows seals employ a static secondary seal (such as an O-ring, high temperature graphite packing, or elastomeric bellows and axial movement is accommodated by contraction or expansion of the bellows.

==== Spring design ====
Many different types of springs are used, including: relatively large single coil springs, multiple sets of small coil springs, and wave springs. A formed or welded metal bellows can also act as the spring. Corrosion, clogging and movement are major considerations when selecting a spring design.

==== Hardware ====
In addition to retaining the other components, the seal hardware includes the drive mechanism which is necessary to prevent axial and rotational slippage of the seal on the shaft. The drive mechanism must withstand the torque produced by the seal faces while also allowing the seal ring to move axially. In addition to torque, the drive mechanism must withstand the axial thrust produced by hydrostatic pressure acting on the components. The various types of drive mechanisms include: dent drive, key drive, set screws, pins, slots, snap rings and many more. Typically, the retainer for the seal ring might include set screws, a dent or slot drive, recesses for the spring and a snap ring to complete the assembly. In contrast, mating ring hardware might be only a pin or slot to prevent rotation. Corrosion is a major consideration when selecting seal hardware.

==== Considerations for secondary sealing elements ====
Both the seal ring and mating must accommodate secondary sealing elements. In some designs, various retainers, sleeves and other components may also include secondary sealing elements. Whereas a simple O-ring might require only a groove for fitting, some secondary sealing elements (for example, packing) might require mechanical compression. Although O-rings are available in many elastomers, sometimes an elastomer might not be compatible with the fluid being sealed or might be considered too expensive. In such cases, a secondary sealing element might be manufactured from perfluoroelastomer and shaped in the form of a wedge, V or U.

=== Configurations ===
Although all end-face mechanical seals must contain the five elements described above, those functional elements may be arranged or oriented in many different ways. Several dimensional and functional standards exist, such as API Standard 682 - Shaft Sealing Systems for Centrifugal and Rotary Pumps, which describes the configurations for used in Oil & Gas applications. Even though the scope of API 682 is somewhat limited, it may be extended to describe end-face mechanical seals in general. Configuration refers to the number and orientation of the components in the end-face mechanical seal assembly. For example, springs may be rotating or stationary. Single or multiple pairs of sealing faces may be used. For multiple seals, the individual pairs of sealing faces may be similarly oriented or opposed. Containment devices such as bushings may or may not be used as part of the configuration.

==== Component vs cartridge ====
The basic components of an end-face mechanical seal may be installed directly onto the shaft but a popular approach is to pre-assemble the components into some sort of package for ease of installation. When the components are pre-assembled onto a sleeve and gland plate, the complete assembly is called a cartridge seal. This complete assembly can be easily slid onto the shaft and bolted in place thus reducing the potential for installation errors. Some cartridge seals use regular component seal parts whereas other cartridge seals might use specific purpose parts. API 682 specifies that only cartridge seals are acceptable to the standard.

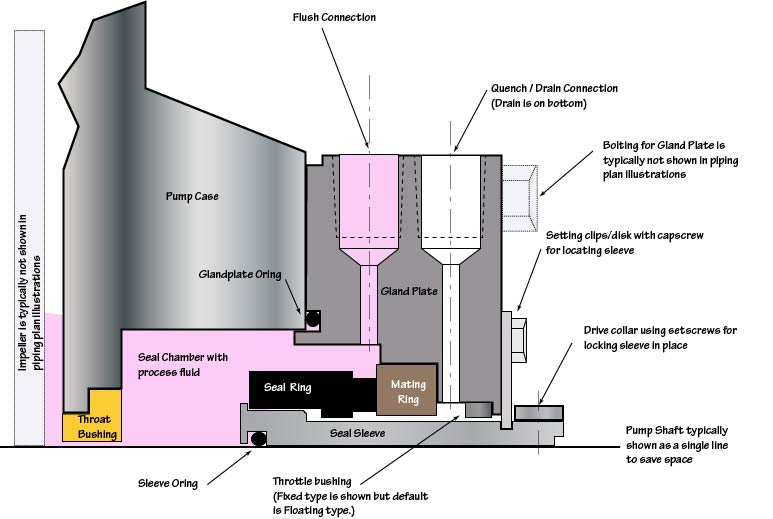
The seal components may be conveniently pre-assembled into a cartridge for ease of installation.

==== Rotating vs stationary springs ====
Either the seal ring or the mating ring may be the rotating element. Seals with rotating seal rings are said to be "rotating" seals; seals with stationary seal rings are said to be "stationary" seals. Because the springs are always associated with the seal rings, sometimes the distinction is made as "rotating springs" versus "stationary springs". For convenience, rotating seals are used in most equipment; however, stationary seals have some advantages over rotating seals. In small, mass-produced seals for modest services, the entire seal may be placed in a package which minimizes shaft and housing requirements for the equipment. Stationary seals are also used to advantage in large sizes or at high rotational speeds.

==== Single vs multiple ====
When classifying end-face mechanical seals by configuration, the first consideration is whether there is only one set of sealing faces or multiple sets. If multiple sets are used, are the sets configured to be unpressurized or pressurized.

===== Tandem seals =====
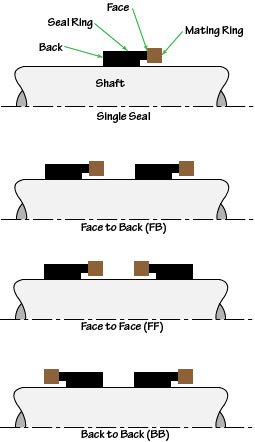
Multiple seals may be oriented in Face-to-Face, Face-to-Back or Back-to-Back directions.

A tandem seal consists of two sets primary sealing surfaces with the space in-between the two seals filled with a compatible low pressure fluid called the buffer fluid. This buffer fluid/space may be monitored to detect performance of the assembly. Unfortunately, the definition of “tandem seal” was often stated in a confusing manner. In particular, a tandem seal was usually described as two seals pointing in the same direction; that is, in a face-to-back orientation. This orientation is not necessary to the function of the configuration and the API chose to use the term Arrangement 2 instead of tandem in the API 682 standard.

===== Double seals =====
A double seal consists of two sets primary sealing surfaces with the space in-between the two seals filled with a compatible pressurized fluid called the barrier fluid. This barrier fluid/space may be monitored to detect performance of the assembly. Unfortunately, the definition of “double seal” was often stated in a confusing manner. In particular, a double seal was usually described as two seals pointing in the opposite direction; that is, in a back-to-back orientation. This orientation is not necessary to the function of the configuration and the API chose to use the term Arrangement 3 instead of double in the API 682 standard.

== Seal piping plans ==
An end-face mechanical seal generates heat from rubbing and viscous shear and must be cooled to assure good performance and reliable operation. Typically, cooling is provided by circulating fluid around the seal. This fluid, known as a flush, may be the same as the fluid being sealed or an entirely different fluid. The flush may be heated, filtered or otherwise treated to improve the operating environment around the seal. Collectively, the flush and treating systems are known as piping plans. Piping plans for mechanical seals are defined by American Petroleum Institute specification 682 and are given a number. Some piping plans are used for single seals and some only for multiple seals. Some piping plans are intended to provide a means of monitoring the seal. Some sealing systems include more than one piping plan. See the table below for a summary and description of piping plans.

API Plan	Description
01, 02, 03	Internal system for single seals
11, 12, 13, 14	Simple recirculation system for single seals
21, 23, 31, 41	Recirculation system with auxiliary equipment for single seals
52, 53A-C, 54, 55, 74	External system for dual seals
32, 62	External injection system
65A/B, 66A/B	Leakage containment and management
61, 71	Connections only (plugged)
72, 75, 76	External control and leakage management system for containment seals
99	Miscellaneous, requires a sketch

== Origins and development ==
The mechanical seal appears to have been invented by George J. Cooke His design was originally called a "Cooke Seal" and he founded the Cooke Seal Company. Cooke's seal (which actually did not have a means of drive) was first used in refrigeration compressors. The Cooke Seal Company was a sideline product for Cooke and he sold the company to Muskegon Piston Ring Company where it became the Rotary Seal Division. Muskegon Piston Ring sold its Rotary Seal Division to EG&G Sealol who were later acquired by John Crane Incorporated.

The first commercially successful mechanical seal to be used on centrifugal pumps was probably made by the Cameron Division of the Ingersoll-Rand Company. The Cameron seal was installed in a number of centrifugal pipeline pumps in 1928.

Mechanical seals in the 1930s often used a face combination of hardened steel versus leaded bronze. Carbon-graphite was not widely used as a seal face material until after World War II. Soft packing was used as secondary sealing elements. The O-ring was developed in the 1930s but not used in mechanical seals until after World War II.

In the late 1930s, probably about 1938 or 1939, mechanical seals began to replace packing on automobile water pumps. The famous Jeep of WWII used a rubber bellows seal in the water pump. After WWII, all automobile water pumps used mechanical seals.

In the mid-1940s pump manufacturers such as Ingersoll-Rand, Worthington, Pacific, Byron Jackson, United, Union and others began to make their own mechanical seals. Eventually most of these companies got out of the seal business but the Byron Jackson seal became the Borg-Warner seal (now Flowserve) and the Worthington seal was sold to Chempro (now John Crane - Sealol).

Cartridge seals were used on a regular basis by 1950; this convenient packaging of seal, sleeve and gland was probably developed by C. E. Wiessner of Durametallic about 1942.

By 1954, mechanical seals were used with such regularity in the refining and process industries that the American Petroleum Institute included seal specifications in the first edition of its Standard 610, "Centrifugal Pumps for General Refinery Services".

By 1956, many of the conceptual designs and application guidelines that are in use today had been developed. Commercially available designs included both rotating and stationary flexible elements, balanced and unbalanced hydraulic loading, rubber and metal bellows, and a wide variety of spring designs and types. Secondary sealing elements included O-rings, wedges, U-cups and various packings. Carbon-graphite was widely used as a seal face material; the mating seal face was often cast iron, Ni-resist, 400 series stainless steel, Stellite or aluminum oxide although tungsten carbide was coming into use. Stainless steel was widely used for springs, retainers, sleeves and glands. Single and multiple seal arrangements were used as necessary to accomplish the required performance. In 1957, Sealol introduced the edge welded metal bellows seal. Previously, metal bellows seals had used a formed bellows which was much thicker and stiffer.

In 1959, John C. Copes of Baton Rouge, LA filed for a patent on a split seal and was awarded Patent #3025070 in 1962. In the Copes design, only the faces were split. Copes chose to provide custom split seals which he manufactured himself so very few of his split seals were produced.

The Clean Air Act of 1990 placed limits on fugitive emissions from pumps. Seal manufacturers responded with improved designs and better materials. In October, 1994, the American Petroleum Institute released API Standard 682, "A Shaft Sealing Systems for Centrifugal and Rotary Pumps”. This standard had a major effect on the sealing industry. In addition to providing guidelines for seal selection, API 682 requires qualification testing by the seal manufacturers. API 682 is now in its 4th Edition and work has begun on 5th Edition.

There has been much consolidation in the mechanical seal industry. Among the major manufacturers:

- John Crane (Est 1917)(Smiths Group of Great Britain) includes Sealol (Rotary), Flexibox, Safematic, Ropac;
- Flowserve includes BW/IP (Borg-Warner), Durametallic, Five Star, Pacific Wietz;
- A.W. Chesterton Co. (Est. 1884)
- EagleBurgmann includes Eagle, Burgmann.

Today, in addition to face patterns such as spiral grooves and waves, materials have been developed that have special surfaces to promote hydrodynamic lift. Lasers can be used to etch microscopic, performance enhancing textures on the surface of the seal face. Piezoelectric materials and electronic controls are being investigated for creating truly controllable seals. The application of specialized seal face patterns, surfaces, and controls is an emerging technology that is developing rapidly with future applications still being worked on.

== See also ==
- Labyrinth Seal
- Dry gas seal
