= API Standard 682 =

Industry standard for end face mechanical seals

API Standard 682, titled "Pumps - Shaft Sealing Systems for Centrifugal and Rotary Pumps," is the American Petroleum Institute (API) standard for end-face mechanical seals. The purpose of API 682 is to assist in the selection and operation of end face mechanical seals in centrifugal pumps. It is based on the combined knowledge and experience of seal manufacturers, engineering companies, and end users. API 682 is primarily intended for use in the petroleum, natural gas and chemical industries, but is often referenced for other types of equipment and industries.

The API has approximately 500 technical standards for processes and components.

== Background and development ==
By the late 1980s, mechanical seals had been accepted as the preferred method for sealing rotating pumps for many years. However, mechanical seal standards were generally buried in other standards such as DIN 24960, ANSI B73, and API 610. All of these standards were primarily pump standards and any references to seals were directed at how mechanical seals would interact with pumps.

API 610 is the API standard about centrifugal pumps and is primarily intended for use in the petroleum, natural gas and chemical industries. Although the 1st through 7th Editions of API 610 included specifications for mechanical seals, beginning with the 8th Edition, API 610 defers to API 682 for seal specifications.

In the late 1980s a group of refinery equipment engineers and managers began to compare sealing solutions in refinery applications. This group, led by V. R. Dodd of Chevron, came up with a general plan and the American Petroleum Institute (API) agreed to establish a standard for mechanical seals: API 682. A Task Force was formed in 1990 and the first meeting was held in January 1991. This Task Force was composed of fourteen members from various refineries, seal and pump manufacturers. API 682, First Edition, was published in October 1994.

One interesting aspect of API 682 is that it includes a strong set of defaults. That is, unless the user indicates otherwise, API 682 makes default choices for specifics such as:

- Seal type
- Rotating or stationary
- Seal arrangement
- Seal configuration/orientation
- Materials
- Piping plan
- ... many others.

Some statements within API 682 are normative, that is, required, whereas others are informative, that is, descriptive but not required. In particular, many of the illustrations are informative. This distinction has not always been apparent to the reader.

Subsequent editions of API 682 have been published. The current edition is 4th Edition.

== API 682 1st edition ==
The first edition of API 682 was entirely new although parts of it were extracted from the pump standard API 610 and existing API standard paragraphs.

The mission statement for the 1st Edition was:

"This standard is designed to default to the equipment types most commonly supplied that have a high probability of meeting the objective of at least three years of uninterrupted service while complying with emissions regulations."

Although this mission statement no longer appears in the standard, it remains the basic principle driving the work of the API 682 Task Force and its relevance remains the same for the 4th Edition as it did for the 1st.

In addition to providing requirements for mechanical seals, the 1st Edition of API 682 also provided a guide on how to select the correct seal for a number of common refinery applications. In order to provide this seal selection guide, it was necessary to categorize applications into a number of services:

- Non-hydrocarbon
- water
- sour water
- caustics/amines
- acids
- Non-flashing hydrocarbon
- Flashing hydrocarbon.

It was also necessary to categorize the many different type seals that were used in these services. Three seal types were designated:

- Type A – O-ring pusher
- Type B – O-ring metal bellows
- Type C – flexible gasket (high temperature) metal bellows.

Prior to API 682, 1st Edition, multiple seals were designated as being either “tandem” or “double” seals; however, advances in seal design had rendered these classic terms obsolete. As a result, there was some confusion on how multiple seals were designated. The task force decided to use a more descriptive designation and chose to define dual seal arrangements. A dual seal would be two sets of sealing faces used in the same seal chamber. The fluid between these two sets of sealing faces could be either pressurized or unpressurized. Three standard arrangements were defined:

- Arrangement 1 is a single seal
- Arrangement 2 is a dual unpressurized seal
- Arrangement 3 is a dual pressurized seal.

API 682 1st Edition did not include containment seals or dry gas barrier seals.

After having defined the services, seal types, and seal arrangements, a series of flowcharts were created to help in selecting a seal type, special materials or design requirements, and supporting piping plans.

API 682 seals were to have a high probability of three years of reliable service. In order to prove this, seal performance testing on process fluids under representative pressures and temperatures was required. These performance tests are called “Qualification Tests”.

The general idea of the qualification test was to prove that the design was sound. The goal of the qualification test was to simulate a long-term steady state run followed by a process upset. The simulated process upset consisted of pressure changes, temperature changes and included loss of flush. The results of these tests were made available to the purchaser for evaluation. There was no acceptance criteria presented in API 682 1st Edition.

In addition to the qualification test of the design, every API 682 seal, whether new or repaired, is to be pressure tested with air before being shipped to the end user.

== API 682 2nd edition ==
One of the major criticisms of API 682 1st Edition was that all the seals were “heavy duty” and therefore expensive with no alternatives for easy services. To some degree, this was intentional and was done in order to reduce inventory, promote familiarity with a limited number of seal types and to increase reliability. Another criticism of API 682 1st Edition was that it considered only API 610 pumps and only refinery applications. The chemical and petrochemical industries routinely use ASME pumps in addition to API 610 pumps. Broadening the scope of pumps covered by API 682 would allow standardized seals to be applied in a greater number of industries.

In 2nd Edition, the organization of API 682 was changed to conform to ISO standards: This reorganization means that there is no simple cross reference guide between 1st edition and 2nd edition paragraph numbers.

=== Categories ===
The 2nd Edition introduced the concept of seal categories. A seal category describes the type of pump into which the seal will be installed, the operating window, the design features, and the testing and documentation requirements. There are three categories designated as Category 1, 2, or 3.

Category 1 seals are intended for non-API-610 pumps. This category is applicable for temperatures between −40 and 500 °F (−40 and 260 °C) and pressures to 315 PSI (22 bar).

Category 2 seal are intended for API-610 This category is applicable for temperatures between −40 and 750 °F (−40 and 399 °C) and pressures to 615 PSI (42 bar).

Category 3 seals are essentially the original seals of 1st Edition and are also intended for API-610 pumps. Category 3 seals are intended for the most demanding applications. This category is applicable for temperatures between −40 and 750 °F (−40 and 399 °C) and pressures to 615 PSI (42 bar). Design features include a distributed flush and floating throttle bushing for single seals. Additional documentation must be also provided.

=== New seal types ===
Three new seal types were introduced in the 2nd Edition: dry running containment seals, non-contacting seals, and dual gas barrier seals.

Containment seals are the outer seal of Arrangement 2. In the 2nd Edition, containment seals can be used with a liquid buffer fluid, a gas buffer fluid or without a buffer fluid. In the case of a dry running containment seal, the containment seal will be exposed primarily to buffer gas or vaporized process fluid. Such containment seals must therefore be designed for continuous dry running while meeting the reliability goals of the standard. Dry running containment seals may be either contacting or non-contacting.

Non-contacting inner seals are also introduced for Arrangement 2. One of the primary targets for non-contacting inner seals is in flashing hydrocarbon services. In some of these services, it is impossible to obtain adequate vapor margins to prevent flashing of the fluid in the seal chamber. This seal will be used with a dry running containment seal and the leakage past the inner seal will be piped to a vapor recovery system.

The other new seal type introduced in 2nd Edition was the dry running gas seal used in Arrangement 3. This seal is designed to run on a gas barrier fluid such as nitrogen.

=== New piping plans ===
Several new piping plans were introduced in the 2nd Edition. These included additional options for dual pressurized liquid seals as well as new piping plans to support containment seals and dual pressurized gas seals.

=== New qualification procedures ===
One of the strengths of the 1st Edition was to provide qualification tests in which seal vendors would be required to prove the suitability of their seals for a given service. The 2nd Edition expanded on these requirements by adding new tests for containment seals and dual gas seals as well as defining acceptance criteria for all tests.

== API 682 3rd edition ==
For all practical purposes, API 682 3rd Edition is the same as 2nd Edition. The completed 2nd Edition was submitted to the ISO Organization for approval as their ISO 21049. At the time, API and ISO had an agreement to jointly issue standards. The ISO Organization made slight editorial changes to 2nd Edition, including correcting typographical errors and unit conversions. Therefore, API had to re-issue a corrected 2nd edition but choose to label it as 3rd edition. API 682 3rd Edition was published in September 2004.

API and ISO no longer have the agreement to jointly issue standards. The 2004 issue of ISO 21049 is the only issue and plans to update it are unknown.

== API 682 4th edition ==
A twenty-five member task force spent six years updating 3rd Edition to 4th Edition. The 4th Edition of API 682 is organized similarly to the 2nd and 3rd Editions:

1. Scope
2. Normative references
3. Terms, Definitions, and Symbols
4. Sealing Systems
5. General
6. Design Requirements
7. Specific Seal Configurations
8. Accessories
9. Instrumentation
10. Inspection, Testing, and Preparation for Shipment
11. Data Transfer

Annexes

- Annex A – Recommended Seal Selection Procedure
- Annex B – Typical Materials and Material Specifications
- Annex C – Mechanical Seals Datasheets
- Annex D – Seal Codes
- Annex E – Mechanical Seals Data Requirement Forms
- Annex F – Technical Tutorials and Illustrative Calculations
- Annex G – Standard Piping Plans and Auxiliary Hardware
- Annex H – Inspectors’ Checklist for All Seals
- Annex I – Seal Qualification Testing

=== Configurations ===
Seal Configuration refers to the orientation of the seal components in an assembly. In previous editions, orientations were defined as face-to-back, back-to-back, and face-to-face and these terms are carried over into the 4th Edition. In 4th Edition, any orientation (face to back, back to back, face to face) can be used in a dual seal provided that the design features are appropriate to the functionality of that particular arrangement.

=== Clearances ===
Fourth Edition added additional specifications for clearances, placed these requirements in the form of tables and noted that seal components are not to be considered as “shaft catchers” to restrict shaft movement. The minimum clearances specified apply only to equipment within the scope of the standard. Equipment outside that scope, such as non-cartridge seals, older pumps, non-API 610 pumps and certain severe services, might benefit from larger clearances.

=== Codes ===
Before API 682, API 610 (the pump standard) used a simple seal code to specify seals. API 682 attempted to use a more comprehensive seal code; however, that code changed with every edition of API 682. The 4th Edition code, described in Annex D, is probably the best to date and includes some concepts and codes from the historical API 610 seal code. The new code uses eight fields:

- Seal category
- Seal arrangement
- Seal type
- Containment device
- Gasket material
- Face material
- Approximate shaft size (in millimeters)
- Piping plan

As an example, the 4th Edition code might be 31B-LIN-075-53A to indicate:

- 3 – Category 3
- 1 – Arrangement 1
- B – Type B seal
- L – Floating bushing
- I – FFKM secondary seals
- N – Carbon vs reaction bonded silicon carbide
- 075 – installed on a 75 mm shaft
- 53A – Plan 53A

=== Piping plans ===
Annex G provides illustrations and a short tutorial about each piping plan. As has been the case for every edition, changes were made to the standard piping plans. In particular, the piping plans now default to using transmitters with local indicators as part of the instrumentation.

API Plan	Description
01	Internal recirculation from pump discharge
02	No circulation (“Dead-ended”)
03	Circulation created by seal chamber design
11	By-pass from discharge to seal chamber
12	By-pass from discharge through strainer to seal chamber
13	Recirculation from seal chamber to pump suction
14	By-pass from discharge to seal and back to pump suction
21	By-pass from discharge through cooler to seal chamber
22	By-pass from discharge through strainer, orifice, cooler to seal chamber
23	Recirculation from pumping ring through cooler to seal chamber
31	By-pass from discharge through cyclone separator to seal chamber
32	Injection from external source to seal chamber
41	By-pass from discharge through cyclone separator and cooler to seal chamber
51	Dead-ended atmospheric quench
52	Unpressurized external reservoir with forced circulation by pumping ring
53A	Pressurized external reservoir with forced circulation by pumping ring
53B	Pressurized external bladder type reservoir with forced circulation by pumping ring
53C	Pressurized external piston type reservoir with forced circulation by pumping ring
54	Circulation of pressurized barrier fluid from external system
55	Circulation of unpressurized buffer fluid from external system
61	Tapped connections only (single seal)
62	Quench fluid from external source
65A	Atmospheric leakage collection and detection system for single seals
65B	Atmospheric leakage collection and detection system for single seals
66A	Atmospheric leakage detection system for single seals
66B	Atmospheric leakage detection system for single seals
71	Tapped connections only (dual seal)
72	External buffer gas purge for secondary containment seals
74	Pressurized external barrier gas system
75	Secondary containment seal drain for condensing leakage
76	Secondary containment seal drain for non-condensing leakage
99	Engineered piping plan not defined by existing plans; illustrative drawing or sketch is required

== Future editions ==
API standards are reviewed every five years and re-issued every ten years. A new Taskforce for API 682 was formed in 2017 and preparations for 5th Edition are underway.
