= Dalian Port (PDA) Company =

Chinese port operator company

Dalian Port (PDA) Company Limited 大連港股份有限公司
- Company type: State-owned enterprise
- Industry: Port operation
- Founded: 2005
- Headquarters: Dalian, Liaoning, People's Republic of China
- Area served: People's Republic of China
- Key people: Chairman: Mr. Sun Hong
- Parent: PDA Corporation
- Website: Dalian Port (PDA) Company Limited

Liaoning Port Co., Ltd. (SEHK: 2880) is the port operator of the Port of Dalian, Dalian, Liaoning, China. It provides container loading and discharging services, storage services for crude oil, refined oil and liquefied chemicals, container logistics services and the operation of container depots, warehouses, shipping agencies and cargo forwarders, and a bonded logistics park.

The company was established in 2005. It was listed on the Hong Kong Stock Exchange in 2006 with its IPO price of HK$2.575 per share. It received the retail portion of its IPO with 851 times oversubscribed and the institutional tranche with 90 times oversubscribed.

== See others ==
- Port of Dalian
