= Persian Gulf Star Oil Company =

Iran state oil company

The Persian Gulf Star Oil Company (PGSOC) is an Iranian gas and oil company involved in the design, management, financing, construction, operation and maintenance of the Persian Gulf Star Condensate Refinery, a gas‑condensate complex on the outskirts of Bandar Abbas in southern Iran. Registered in 2007, it was built in three 120 kb/d phases (total ≈ 360 kb/d) and is being expanded toward 480 kb/d. The refinery was constructed under international sanctions by the Islamic Revolutionary Guard Corps' engineering arm, Khatam‑al‑Anbiya Construction Headquarters, whose commanders have hailed the plant as a flagship project achieved "despite the cruel sanctions" and say it now supplies about 45 million liters on a daily basis.

The Persian Gulf Star Oil Company, was formally added to the U.S. Specially Designated Nationals list on 6 July 2022 under Executive Order 13846, making any transaction with it sanction‑able worldwide. In Europe, Council Regulation (EU) 267/2012 imposes a blanket ban on the import, purchase or transport of Iranian crude-oil, petroleum and petrochemical products, so PGSOC cargoes cannot lawfully enter EU markets. To keep exports flowing, Iran relies on a "shadow fleet" that disables AIS signals, conducts multi‑step ship‑to‑ship transfers and forges cargo paperwork, methods catalogued in OFAC's 16 April 2025 maritime advisory, which cites the tanker Corona Fun for automatic identification system (AIS) manipulation while carrying Iranian oil. China is believed to be a key buyer of Persian Gulf Star Refinery fuels, with Iranian crude oil and condensate repeatedly arriving in Chinese ports on clandestine tankers. Pakistan is a primary over-land smuggling destination of Iranian fuel moving an estimated 2.8 billion liters of PGSOC-origin petrol and diesel fuel into Pakistan each year, according to testimony before Pakistan's Senate Commerce Committee.

== Development and IRGC involvement ==
PGSOC was conceived around 2006–2007 to enable Iran to refine its own gas condensate domestically. The refinery's three phases were progressively added: Phase I was inaugurated in April 2017 (with the first gasoline shipment in June 2017), Phase II entered service in June 2018, and phase III was inaugurated on Feb 18, 2019. Planning and construction were repeatedly delayed by mismanagement and Western sanctions. The Islamic Revolutionary Guard Corps (IRGC) played a major role in PGSR's construction and operation. All three refinery phases were executed by Khatam al-Anbia Construction Headquarters (the IRGC's engineering arm). According to Mehr News Agency, IRGC Brig. Gen. Ebadollah Abdollahi said that the construction of the refinery by Khatam al-Anbia under sanctions "thwarted the malicious plots of enemies and their hostile policies against Iran" and "will also entail development and prosperity of the country in various fields".

== Refinery and output ==
PGSOC's Bandar Abbas complex integrates distillation, reforming, and hydrotreating units on a multi-unit refinery site. It processes natural gas condensate from the South Pars/North Dome field on the Iran-Qatar maritime border. Each of the three phases was designed to produce about 12 million liters/day of gasoline (Euro-IV spec) plus significant volumes of diesel, kerosene and liquefied petroleum gas, aiming for a total capacity of about 360,000 barrels per day of condensate. The refinery has enabled Iran to become self-sufficient in gasoline production and even to export surplus fuels. In one report PGSR was credited with boosting Iran's gasoline output to ~110 million liters/day, vs. ~74 million for domestic consumption. In practical terms, PGSR supplies a very large fraction of Iran's fuel: Iranian sources report it accounts for roughly 25% of the nation's gasoline and about 19% of total refining capacity.

== Sanctions ==
PGSOC is a sanctioned entity under U.S. programs and the sanctions imposed by allied countries, including the European Union, the United Kingdom, Canada, and Japan. Most notably, on July 6, 2022, the U.S. Treasury's Office of Foreign Assets Control (OFAC) added PGSOC to the Specially Designated Nationals (SDN) list under EO 13846 (Imposing Additional Sanctions on Iran). This designation blocks any U.S. property of PGSOC and prohibits U.S. persons from dealing with it. In parallel, the EU and UK have had broad sanctions on Iranian oil: EU Council Regulation 267/2012 (as amended) bans virtually all imports of Iranian crude oil and products, and UK Iran-related regulations similarly prohibit UK persons from supporting Iran's oil exports. While PGSOC may not be individually named in EU/UK lists, its products are subject to the same embargoes. Likewise, allied countries (Canada, Japan, etc.) have restrictions on Iranian petroleum trade. Earlier U.S. campaigns (e.g. 2019–2020) also targeted Iranian petrochemical networks connected to PGSOC by association, including some trading firms and vessels.

=== Sanctions evasion tactics ===
PGSOC's exports have been tied to sophisticated evasion schemes. Iran relies on a so-called "shadow fleet" of ageing tankers that alter their identities and routes to obscure oil movements. For example, U.S. sanctions cited the Panama-flagged tanker Corona Fun, which "manipulated [its] automatic identification system" (AIS) signals to disguise an Iranian oil cargo. Leaked intelligence ("Sahara Thunder" emails) revealed that Iranian traders routinely shift cargoes at sea, swap vessels, forge bills of lading and even fake GPS/AIS signals to hide oil shipments. Satellite-tracking investigators have documented vessels turning off AIS, reflagging, and blending sanctioned cargoes with other oils mid-voyage. China is believed to be a key buyer of PGSR fuels, with Iranian crude and condensate repeatedly arriving in Chinese ports on clandestine tankers. On land, a major abuse is cross-border smuggling: Pakistani officials report 20–35 million liters per day of Iranian petrol/diesel illegally entering Pakistan. Smaller tanker transfers and truck convoys likewise move subsidized Iranian fuel into Gulf states and South Asia. Such methods – shadow fleet, AIS spoofing, ship-to-ship transfers, forged documents and large-scale smuggling – have been repeatedly cited in U.S. advisories and media reports on Iran's illicit oil trade.
