= Street name securities =

Type of securities of companies

The phrase street name securities or "nominee name securities" is used in the United States to refer to securities of companies which are held electronically in the account of a stockbroker or bank or custodian, similar to a bank account. The entity whose name is recorded as the legal owner of the securities is known as the "nominee owner," and that entity has ownership rights in the security. The nominee owner holds those ownership rights on behalf of the true economic owner who is referred to as the beneficial owner.

In the US, Cede & Co., a nominee of Depository Trust Company, is typically the largest stockholder of a company. In the US where Cede & Co. is the street name holder, therefore, all beneficial rights such as voting rights and dividends flow first to the nominee holder Cede, and then are passed onward, and ultimately to the beneficial owners. In the United Kingdom this is known as holding shares in a nominee account.

As well as the terminology differing between countries, the commercial practice also differs from country to country.

The popularity of nominee accounts, which have existed for over a century, has increased rapidly since the introduction of Internet share dealing in the late 1990s and in some cases stocks can only be held electronically, such as exchange-traded funds, but holding shares in this way can have disadvantages compared to other methods.

== Holding methods ==
There are three principal ways of holding securities:

- Stock certificate Before the use of electronic technology, all shares were held in certificated form, either
  - as registered shares, where the company maintained a register of owners of shares as well as issuing share certificates, and changes of ownership were registered, or
  - as bearer shares, where ownership was transferred simply by handing the bearer share certificate to the new owner.
- As a "direct" electronic registration in dematerialised form (Personal CREST account in the UK)
- Street name or nominee account

As with direct electronic registration, nominee accounts make paperless telephone and internet trading possible with faster settlement periods and lower commissions than certificate deals. They often enable domestic small investors to gain access to derivatives such as warrants and contracts for difference, to exercise various types of order, and to buy shares on margin. There is no risk of loss or damage to certificates in the name of the beneficial owner. It is also possible to obtain an instant valuation of a whole portfolio.

Because the shares are held in the name of the stockbroker or bank or custodian the name of the beneficial owner does not appear on the share register. This means that dividends, shareholder perks, company reports, details of corporate actions and other communications are sent to the stockbroker rather than the beneficial owner. The extent and methods for handling this can vary considerably between brokers. Failure of the stockbroker or bank to pass on shareholder rights and communications to the beneficial owner is one of the major complaints against nominee accounts and is a reason why in the UK activist shareholder organisations such as The United Kingdom Shareholders' Association are opposed to their use. During 2006 the UK government passed an amendment to the Companies Act 1985 which gave nominee shareholders more rights.

The anonymity of nominee accounts facilitates ownership of shares in controversial companies by individuals. For example, when animal rights protestors threatened shareholders of pharmaceutical laboratories involved in testing on animals, such as Huntingdon Life Sciences and GlaxoSmithKline. Unable to identify the actual beneficial owners, protestors intimidated the employees of the stockbroker firms instead, to discourage them from handling such shares.

== Legal framework ==
=== In the United States ===
Regarding nominees who are the registered owners of securities, the controlling legislation for the basic nominee relationship is Article 8: Investment Securities of the Uniform Commercial Code as amended, which was enacted by the State legislatures.

Article 8 provides for a system of heavily intermediated securities holding where transfers are by book-entries and stock certificates are registered in the name of a designated nominee entity.

=== In the United Kingdom ===
It is not normal practice in the UK for nominees to arrange for copies of accounts and other shareholder communications to be sent to the beneficial owners of the shares. The UK Shareholders Association published a list of the perceived disadvantages for UK customers of nominee accounts compared with certificated ownership or direct electronic ownership (CREST).

Because investment firms offering nominee services are the legal owners of the shares, there remains a risk of improper behavior causing the shares to be lost. For example, the investment firm may use the shares it holds for short selling transactions and be unable to replace the shares if the investment firm becomes insolvent. The UK Financial Services Compensation Scheme compensates investors on the failure of an investment firm. However the limit in June 2015 stood at £50,000 per person per investment firm and losses above this amount would not be covered. This risk of the shares being lost through malfeasance does not apply when the shares are held by the investor in certificated form.

== See also ==
- Custodian bank
- Nominee trust
- Omnibus Customer Securities Accounts
- Passenger market
- Securities account
