= Securities market participants (United States) =

United States financial participants

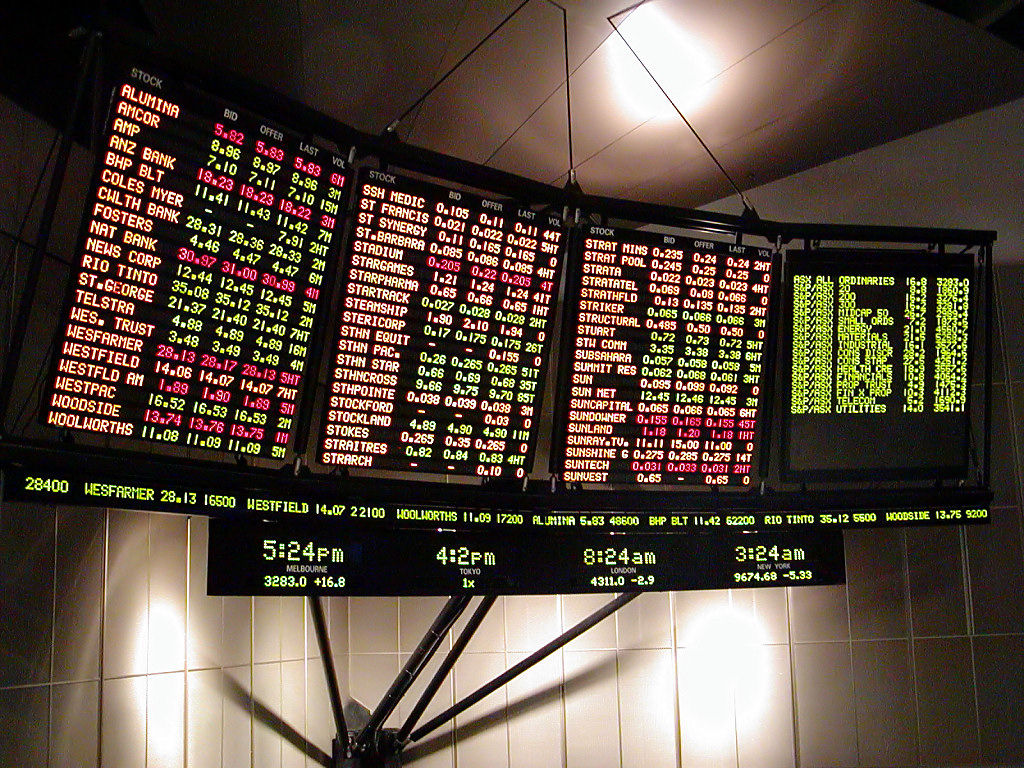
Electronic ticker monitor display, showing the bid and offer status of securities.

Securities market participants in the United States include corporations and governments issuing securities, persons and corporations buying and selling a security, the broker-dealers and exchanges which facilitate such trading, banks which safe keep assets, and regulators who monitor the markets' activities. Investors buy and sell through broker-dealers and have their assets retained by either their executing broker-dealer, a custodian bank or a prime broker. These transactions take place in the environment of equity and equity options exchanges, regulated by the United States Securities and Exchange Commission (SEC), or derivative exchanges, regulated by the Commodity Futures Trading Commission (CFTC). For transactions involving stocks and bonds, transfer agents assure that the ownership in each transaction is properly assigned to and held on behalf of each investor.

Supporting these transactions, there are three central securities depositories and four clearing organizations that assure the settlement of large volumes of trades. Market data consolidators inform investors and regulators in real time of the bid and offer prices of each security through one of two securities information processing systems. The basis for these transactions is controlled both through self-regulatory organizations and the two securities commissions, the SEC and the CFTC.

This article covers those who deal in securities and futures in US markets. Securities include equities (stocks), bonds (US Government, corporate and municipal), and options thereon. Derivatives include futures and options thereon as well as swaps. The distinction in the US relates to having two regulators. Markets in other countries have similar categories of securities and types of participants, though not two regulators.

== Parties to transactions ==
Parties to investment transactions include corporations and governments which raise capital by issuing equity and debt, the selling and buying investors, the broker-dealers and stock exchanges that have the means to transact those deals.

=== Issuers ===
An issuer is a corporation or government which raises capital by issuing either debt or equity. Debt and equity may be issued in various forms, such as bonds, notes and debentures for debt; and common or preferred shares for equity. Issues may be sold privately to investors, or sold to the public via the various markets described below.

=== Investor ===
An investor is a person or corporate entity that makes an investment by buying and selling securities. There are two sub-categories: retail (persons) and institutional (investment managers and hedge funds). Investment managers are either investment companies such as mutual funds or investment advisers which invest for clients.

Investors may not be members of stock exchanges. Rather they must buy and sell securities through broker-dealers which are registered with the appropriate regulatory body for that purpose. In accepting investors as clients, broker-dealers take on the risks of their clients not being able to meet their financial obligations. Hence retail (individual) investors generally are required to keep their investment assets in custody with the broker-dealer through which they buy and sell securities. A broker-dealer would normally not accept an order to buy from a retail clients unless there is sufficient cash on deposit with the broker-dealer to cover the cost of the order, nor sell unless the client already has the security in the broker-dealer's custody.

Institutional investors buy and sell on behalf of their individual clients, be they pension funds, endowments and the like, or pooled funds such as mutual funds, unit trusts or hedge funds. As such, their client assets are safe kept with either custodian banks or broker-dealers (Prime brokerage). Furthermore, institutional investors may buy and sell through any number of broker-dealers which in turn settle such trades at the designated custodians and prime brokers. Investment managers generally differ from hedge funds on how much risk each pursues in its investment strategies. For example, investment managers generally do not sell short, but hedge funds do.

Buying and selling can be either long or short:

Transaction	Long	Short
Buy	Buyer buys securities outright.	Buyer buys back borrowed securities to fulfill obligation.
Sell	Seller sells owned securities outright.	Seller borrows securities, creating an obligation to return such securities.

Retail clients may buy or sell short only under specific agreement with their broker-dealers under a margin account, in which case the broker-dealer either finances the buy or borrows the security for the sell.

Institutional investors must inform their executing broker-dealers as to whether orders are long or short, since those brokers have no way of knowing their clients' positions are in each security.

Were investors able either to buy short naked (without borrowing money to pay), or sell short naked (without borrowing securities to deliver), such practices could easily lead to market manipulation of stock prices: since buyers or sellers would not have the restraint of providing cash or securities, they could conceivably have unlimited buys or sells, which would drive prices up or down. Naked short buying is not a problem because custodians and prime brokers have their own finances from which to lend money to their clients in order to settle the trades. Naked short selling can be a problem. It occurs when a prime broker is unable to borrow the stock simply because there is none available for that purpose. Hedge funds are expected to find sources of stock which can be borrowed before executing short sell orders. If they fail to do so, and their prime broker cannot borrow for them, then the settlement of such trades cannot take place on the settlement date. Whether such a "fail" is due to poor co-ordination among the various parties (hedge fund, lending entity and prime broker) or to a naked short sale is impossible to determine. In the US the SEC effectively ended such instances by making the cost of a failed short sell too expensive for the hedge fund to risk. If on the morning the short sell is scheduled to settle the prime broker cannot deliver the securities to the executing broker, then the latter is obligated to buy-in the shares (in effect, making the delivery). The buy-in occurs at the then prevailing market price. This may be much higher than the price at which the hedge fund first sold the securities, resulting in a potentially substantial loss to the hedge fund.

=== Broker-dealers ===
The thousands of US broker-dealers must all be registered with FINRA or a national securities exchange, or both. Commodity brokers include Futures Commission Merchants, Commodity Trading Advisors and Commodity Pool Operators, which register with the National Futures Association. Firms may register both as a broker-dealer and a commodity broker. In addition, each person employed by these firms who deals with the public must pass industry examinations such as the Series 3 for futures, Series 4 for options and Series 7 exam for equities and bonds. Investors can learn about individual brokers and broker-dealers on the FINRA BrokerCheck website.

=== Stock exchanges ===
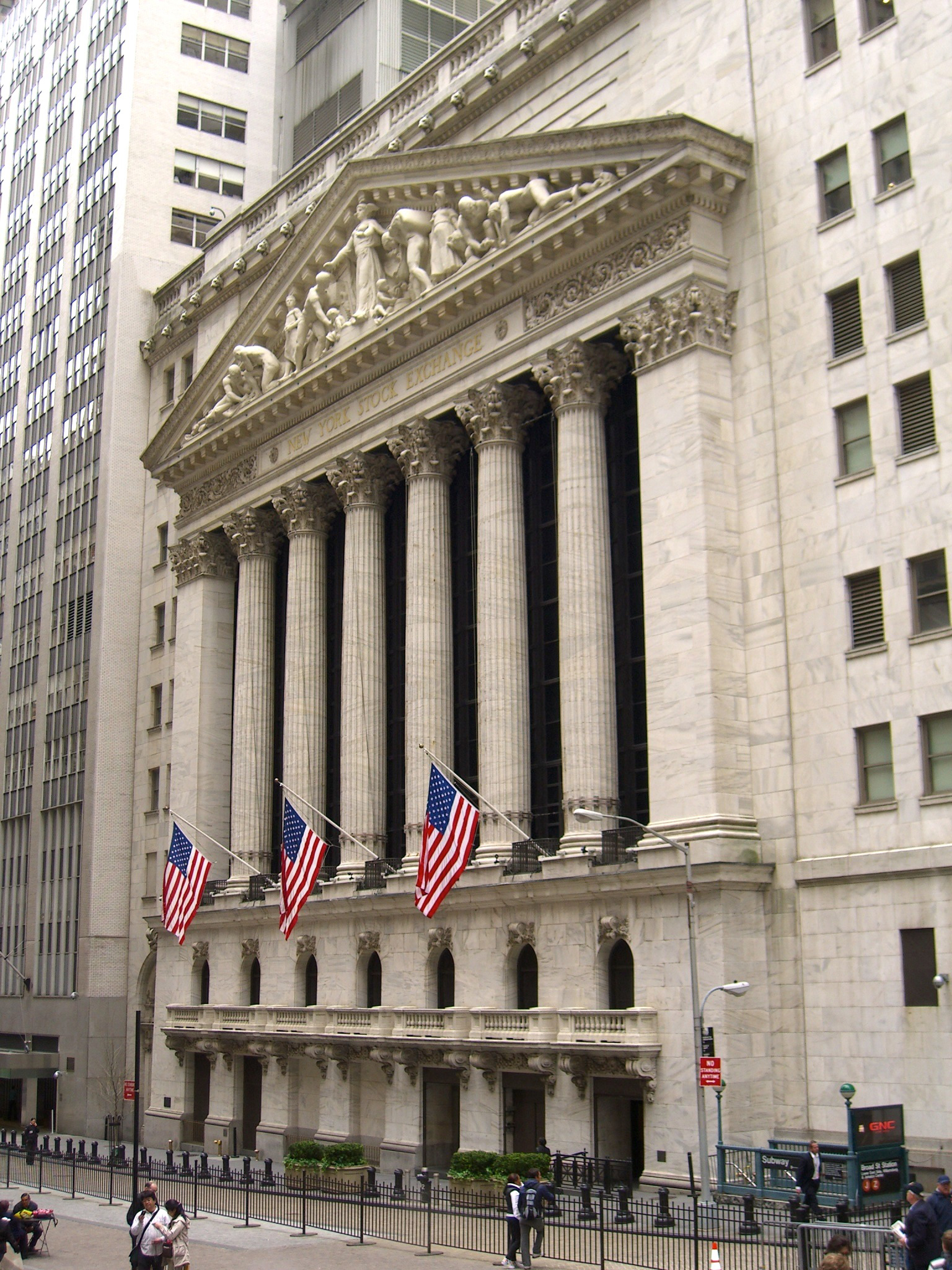
New York Stock Exchange (NYSE), a host of transactions in securities.

A stock exchange is a physical or digital place to which brokers and dealers send buy and sell orders in stocks (also called shares), bonds, and other securities. Price discovery is optimized by bringing together at one point in time and place all buy and sell orders for a particular security.

Securities traded on a stock exchange include stock issued by listed companies, unit trusts, derivatives, pooled investment products and bonds. Stock exchanges often function as "continuous auction" markets, with buyers and sellers consummating transactions at a central location, such as the floor of the exchange.

To qualify for trading on an exchange, a security must first be listed, having met the requirements of the listing exchange. Trade on an exchange is restricted to brokers who are members of the exchange. In recent years, various other trading venues, such as electronic communication networks, alternative trading systems and "dark pools" have taken much of the trading activity away from traditional stock exchanges.

Exchanges for equities, options, futures and derivatives include:

- Equities – multiple exchanges (NYSE, Nasdaq, BATS Global Markets and others) compete for order flow from brokers with different products and pricing
- Options on equities – similar to equities but including the Chicago Board Options Exchange and the International Securities Exchange
- Futures and derivatives – the Chicago Mercantile Exchange, including its acquisitions of similar exchanges, is the sole venue for many derivative contracts, which must be cleared at the same exchanges
- Energy related derivatives – the Intercontinental Exchange (which now owns the NYSE among a number of acquisitions) dominates energy related derivative trading, again with its own clearing arrangements.

US government debt does not trade on exchanges. Rather there are a number of primary dealers which buy directly from the government and resell to other broker-dealers and institutional investors.

== Post-trade environment ==
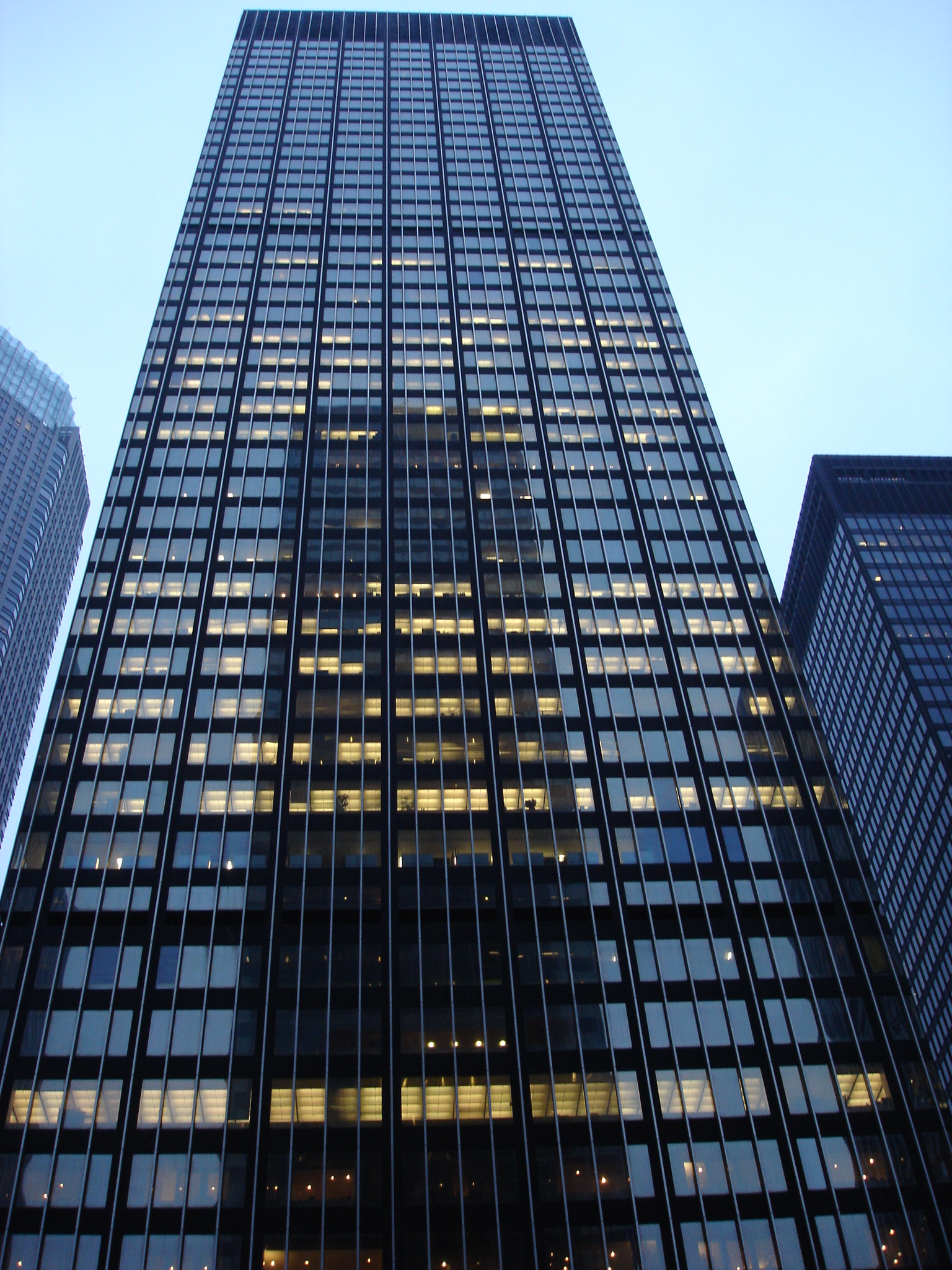
JPMorgan Chase headquarters in New York City—one of the largest custodian banks

Custodian banks, prime brokers, transfer agents, and central securities depositories provide a medium for performing trades and providing safekeeping of securities.

=== Custodian banks ===
Custodian banks offer active safekeeping and administration of clients' securities portfolios. Banks also offer passive safekeeping with safety deposit boxes, but this service is limited to clients' accessing their rented storage boxes. Active safekeeping (custody) involves:

- Receiving securities against payment or free delivery, based on client instructions
- Delivering securities against payment or free delivery, based on client instructions
- Providing clients with monthly statements of all holdings
- Crediting client accounts with dividends, interests and other types of income
- Alerting clients to pending corporate actions and acting on client instructions
- Providing annual tax related information

Clients of custodians are generally institutional investors.

=== Prime brokers ===
Prime brokers are broker-dealers which offer custody and other services to hedge funds. Prime brokerage has generally been considered as more risky than traditional custody, primarily because hedge funds have been viewed as more risky than institutional investors. Moreover, in the US a hedge fund may execute trades through any number of broker-dealers. But in the settlement process, those trades become the trades of the prime broker, as though the hedge fund had executed the trades only through that broker. The risk of the hedge fund's inability to settle those trades becomes that of the prime broker.

The "prime" in the term originally referred to a hedge fund having one broker-dealer for its custody and borrowing purposes. With the events of 2008, most large hedge funds have diversified their holdings among several prime brokers in an effort to limit their risks of a prime broker's failure, such as with Lehman Brothers Europe in 2008.

=== Transfer agent ===
Transfer agents provide a variety of services to issuing companies, including: maintaining a registry of all shareholders, paying dividends and conducting proxy campaigns. Most investments in US equities, corporate bonds and municipal bonds are now held in book entry form, rather than certificates as was the case as recently as the early 1970s when Depository Trust & Clearing Corporation (DTCC) began operations. Thus with the general acceptance of stock immobilization at the central depository, most of the registry function has shifted to reconciling daily immobilized positions with DTCC's nominee firm, Cede & Co. For example, a company has issued 10 million shares. 100,000 shares have been issued in certificated form to a variety of investors. The transfer agent keeps detailed records of these, and verifies the legitimacy of any certificate presented to it. The other 9,900,000 have been purchased by investors who hold them in book entry form through accounts at broker-dealers (retail), custodians and prime brokers (institutional). The "owner" of those 9,900,000 shares on the transfer agent's registry would be Cede & Co., DTCC's nominee company.

=== Central securities depository ===
There are three central securities depositories and four clearing organizations in the US:

==== Central securities depositories ====
- The main securities depository is Depository Trust Company, a subsidiary of the Depository Trust & Clearing Corporation (DTCC)
- The Federal Reserve for all US government bonds and notes
- Chicago Mercantile Exchange CME for futures and other derivative contracts

==== Clearing organizations ====
- National Securities Clearing Corporation, a subsidiary of DTCC, for market-traded stocks and corporate bonds
- Fixed Income Clearing Corporation, also a subsidiary of DTCC, for government bonds and mortgage-backed securities
- Options Clearing Corporation OCC for all equities related options
- Intercontinental Exchange ICE for energy related derivative contracts

US equities, corporate and municipal bonds can be issued in certificated form, though this practice has been largely replaced due to the costs and inefficiencies of keeping them. Rather holdings are kept as "immobilized" or "street name", with the beneficial owners keeping them in accounts at broker-dealers and banks, just as they do for currencies. DTCC uses a nominee firm, Cede & Co., in whose name a share certificate is held in the DTCC vaults. Each day DTCC reconciles with the relevant transfer agent the number of shares held in its accounts for its member banks and broker-dealers. In turn, other banks and broker-dealers hold accounts with DTCC member firms, creating a chain of ownership down to the beneficial owner.

The great advantage of this approach is the efficiency and low cost involved in settling large volumes of trades. The inconvenience is that the issuing corporation no longer knows who its owners are, since its transfer agent has all the immobilized shares recorded as the owner being Cede & Co. For purposes of sending proxy notices and other communications with beneficial owners, the transfer agent, acting on a request of the issuing corporation, sends an inquiry to DTCC, which in turn sends inquiries to its members and so on down the chain.

Options, futures and other derivatives are traded based on contracts, rather than certificates. OCC, CME and ICE act as clearing agents and repositories, keeping track of book entry positions among the various clearing brokers.

US government bonds and notes are uncertificated (dematerialized), which means that certificates are never issued. Instead, the clearing brokers keep book entry positions at the Federal Reserve on behalf of their various clients.

The Financial Stability Oversight Council has designated each of these institutions, with the exception of the Federal Reserve, as a Systemically important financial market utility

== Market data consolidators ==
Market data consolidators address the needs of investors and regulators who wish to know, at any instant during the trading day, what the National Best Bid and Offer is for any security, the last sale price and other pertinent information related to trading the security. Since both the equity and equity options markets have multiple exchanges, quotation and last trades data from all must be consolidated in real time to provide a market view, rather than an individual exchange view.

Two Security Information Processors (SIPs) consolidate this data in real time: the Consolidated Quotation System run by the Intercontinental Exchange (NYSE affiliate) and the OTC/UTP Plan. Each processes data for half of all such securities, based on the ticker symbol of each. All the equity and equity options exchanges broadcast in real time their quotations, last trade and other data to these organizations, which in turn calculate the best bid and offer and redistribute the data to market participants.

The names for these organizations originated several decades ago, when the NYSE and American Stock Exchange were the two venues for corporations to list their stocks. Data from these listings are known as Tape A (NYSE listed) and Tape B (AMEX). At the time, Nasdaq was a quotation system and not an exchange. This explains the name still used: Over the Counter/Unlisted Trading Privilege for data known as Tape C (Nasdaq).

Revenues from market data amount to a half billion dollars a year, apportioned to each exchange based on the amount of quote and other data broadcast by each. A group of companies, under the banner NetCoalition, along with the Securities Industry and Financial Markets (SIFMA) tried to force the exchanges to price market data based on their costs of producing it, but ultimately lost the argument before the SEC in 2016.

== Oversight ==
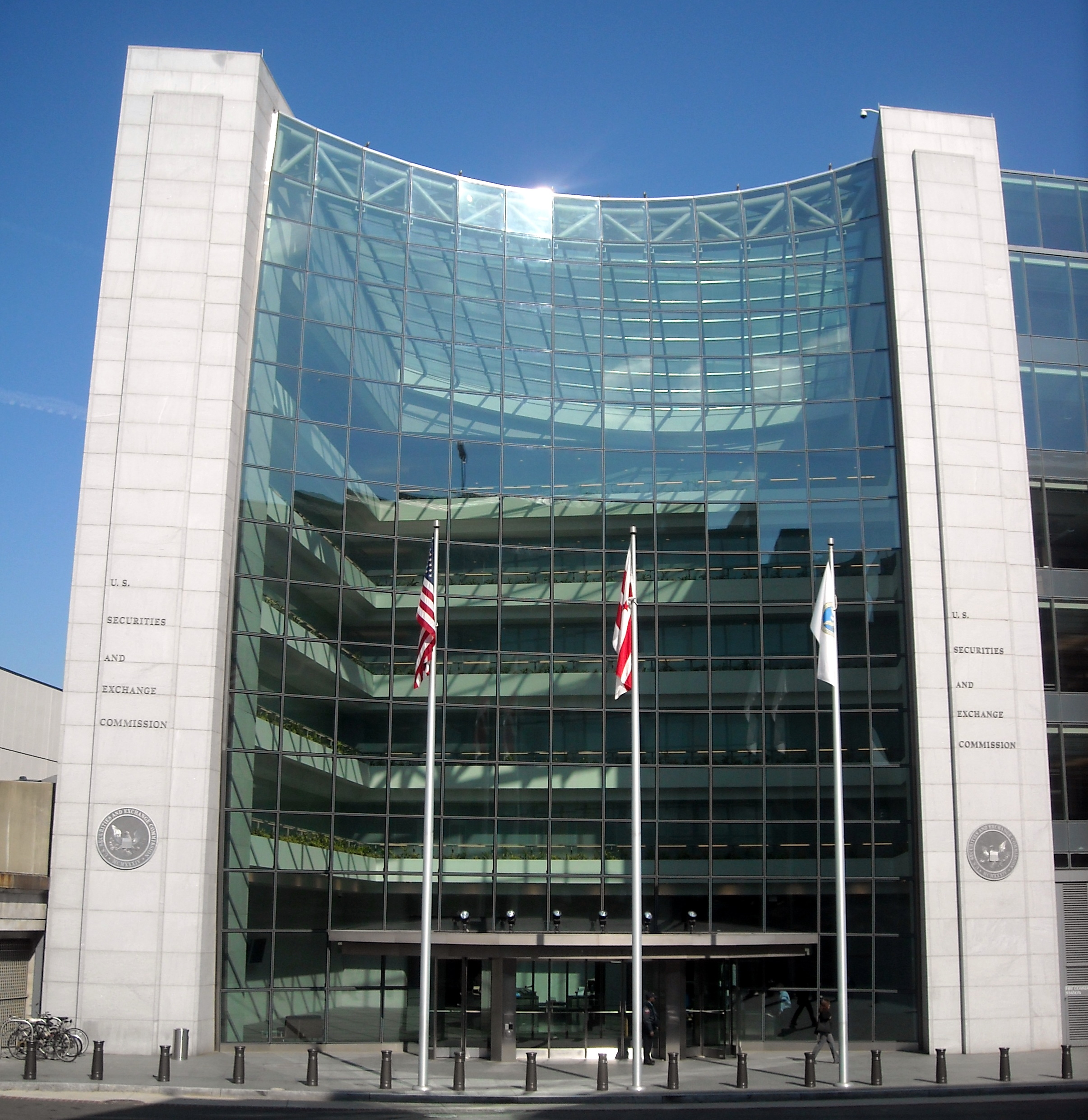
U.S. Securities and Exchange Commission (SEC) headquarters in Washington, D.C. The SEC provides oversight for many securities transactions.

The securities markets are overseen by the SEC, by individual state securities commissions established under blue sky laws, and the self-regulatory organizations, which are overseen by the SEC. The CFTC and NFA also have a role with respect to security futures and security-based swaps. In turn, the CFTC and NFA oversee the derivative markets.

=== Self-regulatory organizations ===
The exchanges and clearing organizations are self-regulatory organizations (SRO's), as are the three sector agencies:

- Financial Industry Regulatory Authority (FINRA)
- National Futures Association (NFA)
- Municipal Securities Rulemaking Board (MSRB)

=== Securities commissions ===
There are two commissions regulating the trading of securities, the U.S. Securities and Exchange Commission (SEC), which governs equities, equity options, corporate bonds, and municipal bonds, and the Commodity Futures Trading Commission (CFTC), which governs activities in the derivatives markets generally.

The SEC is an independent agency of the United States federal government. It holds primary responsibility for enforcing the federal securities laws, proposing securities rules, and regulating the securities industry, the nation's stock and options exchanges, and other activities and organizations, including the electronic securities markets in the United States. The SEC falls under the responsibility of the US Senate Committee on Banking.

The CFTC oversees designated contract markets (DCMs) or exchanges, swap execution facilities (SEFs), derivatives clearing organizations, swap data repository, swap dealers, futures commission merchants, commodity pool operators and other intermediaries. The CFTC falls under the oversight of the Senate Agriculture Committee.

== See also ==
- International Organization of Securities Commissions
- Securities regulation in the United States
- World Federation of Exchanges
