= Cede and Company =

United States financial institution

Cede and Company (also known as Cede and Co. or Cede & Co.) is a specialist United States financial institution that processes transfers of stock certificates on behalf of Depository Trust Company, the central securities depository used by the United States National Market System, which includes the New York Stock Exchange, and Nasdaq. Cede and Company is a shorthand for the phrase "certificate depository". Appropriately, the word "cede" means to "give up (power or territory)" because investors give up their stock and companies give up their shareholders to an intermediary.

Cede technically owns most of the publicly issued stock in the United States. Thus, most investors do not themselves hold direct property rights in stock, but rather have contractual rights that are part of a chain of contractual rights involving Cede. Securities held at Depository Trust Company are registered in its nominee name, Cede & Co., and recorded on its books in the name of the brokerage firm through which they were purchased; on the brokerage firm's books they are assigned to the accounts of their beneficial owners.

In the last official DTC report disclosing ownership percentages, Cede owned 83% of all issued stocks in the United States in 1998. The other 17% of all issued stocks was owned by directly registered holders through the direct registration system.

== History ==
Founded in 1973, Cede was formed for the purpose of efficiently processing transfers of stock certificates on behalf of the Depository Trust Company. The name "Cede" was selected as a reference to "certificate depository". Cede and Company, also known as "Cede and Co." or "Cede & Co." (shorthand for "certificate depository"), and shorthand for "cede" as defined, meaning to relinquish, give up, hand over. The company is at 55 Water Street, Suite Conc4, New York, New York 10041.

== Structure as a partnership ==
Cede and Company is a New York City-based partnership of certain employees of Depository Trust Company. Cede is a separate legal person from Depository Trust Company, which is owned by DTC Participants, who are banks and brokerage houses, and not employees of DTC.

One reason Cede is structured as a partnership is that each general partner can order transfers of stock registered in the name of the partnership without the need for presenting a separate corporate resolution to the stock issuer's transfer agent or stock register to validate the authority of the transfer.

== See also ==
- Book entry
- Dematerialization (securities)
- Direct holding system
