= Settlement (finance) =

Physical exchange of securities or payment

Settlement is the "final step in the transfer of ownership involving the physical exchange of securities or payment". After settlement, the obligations of all the parties have been discharged and the transaction is considered complete.

In the context of securities, settlement involves their delivery to the beneficiary, usually against (in simultaneous exchange for) payment of money, to fulfill contractual obligations, such as those arising under securities trades. Nowadays, settlement typically takes place in a central securities depository. In the United States, the settlement date for marketable stocks is usually 1 business day after the trade is executed, often referred to as "T+1." For listed options and government securities in the US, settlement typically occurs 1 day after trade execution. In Europe, settlement date has been adopted as 2 business days after the trade is executed. As part of performance on the delivery obligations entailed by the trade, settlement involves the delivery of securities and the corresponding payment. A number of risks arise for the parties during the settlement interval, which are managed by the process of clearing, which follows trading and precedes settlement. Clearing involves modifying those contractual obligations so as to facilitate settlement, often by netting and novation.

== Securities settlement ==
Settlement involves the delivery of securities from one party to another. Delivery usually takes place against payment known as delivery versus payment, but some deliveries are made without a corresponding payment (sometimes referred to as a free delivery, free of payment or FOP delivery, or in the United States, delivery versus free). Examples of a delivery without payment are the delivery of securities collateral against a loan of securities, and a delivery made pursuant to a margin call.

=== Nature ===
==== Traditional (physical) ====
Prior to modern financial market technologies and methods such as depositories and securities held in electronic form, securities settlement involved the physical movement of paper instruments, or certificates and transfer forms. Payment was usually made by paper cheque upon receipt by the registrar or transfer agent of properly negotiated certificates and other requisite documents. Physical settlement securities still exist in modern markets today mostly for private (restricted or unregistered) securities as opposed to those of publicly (exchange) traded securities; however, payment of money today is typically made via electronic funds transfer (in the U.S., a bank wire transfer made through the Federal Reserve's Fedwire system). Physical/paper settlement involves higher risks, inasmuch as paper instruments, certificates, and transfer forms are subject to risks electronic media are not, such as loss, theft, clerical errors, and forgery (see indirect holding system).

The U.S. securities markets experienced what became known as "the paper crunch", as settlement delays threatened to disrupt the operations of the securities markets, which led to the formation of electronic settlement via a central securities depository, specifically the Depository Trust Company (DTC), and ultimately its parent, the Depository Trust & Clearing Corporation. In the United Kingdom, the weakness of paper-based settlement was exposed by a programme of privatisation of nationalised industries in the 1980s, and the Big Bang of 1986 led to an explosion in the volume of trades, and settlement delays became significant. In the market crash of 1987, many investors sought to limit their losses by selling their securities, but found that the failure of timely settlement left them exposed.

==== Electronic ====
The electronic settlement system came about largely as a result of Clearance and Settlement Systems in the World's Securities Markets, a report in 1989 by the Washington-based think tank, the Group of Thirty. This report made nine recommendations with a view to achieving more efficient settlement. This was followed up in 2003 with a report, Clearing and Settlement: A Plan of Action, with twenty recommendations.

In an electronic settlement system, electronic settlement takes place between participants. If a non-participant wishes to settle its interests, it must do so through a participant acting as a custodian. The interests of participants are recorded by credit entries in securities accounts maintained in their names by the operator of the system. It permits both quick and efficient settlement by removing the need for paperwork, and the simultaneous delivery of securities with the payment of a corresponding cash sum (called delivery versus payment, or DVP) in the agreed upon currency.

=== Legal significance ===
After the trade and before settlement, the rights of the purchaser are contractual and therefore personal. Because they are merely personal, the purchaser's rights are at risk in the event of the insolvency of the vendor. After settlement, the purchaser owns securities and his rights are proprietary. Settlement is the delivery of securities to complete trades. It involves upgrading personal rights into property rights and thus protects market participants from the risk of the default of their counterparties.

=== Immobilisation and dematerialisation ===
Immobilisation and dematerialisation are the two broad goals of electronic settlement.

==== Immobilisation ====
Immobilisation entails the use of securities in paper form and the use of a central securities depository or more than one, which is/are electronically linked to a settlement system. Securities (either constituted by paper instruments or represented by paper certificates) are immobilised in the sense that they are held by the depository at all times. In the transition from paper-based to electronic practice, immoblisation often serves as a transitional phase prior to dematerialisation.

The Depository Trust Company in New York is the largest immobilizer of securities in the world. Euroclear Bank and Clearstream Banking SA are two examples of international immobilisation systems. Both originally settled eurobonds, but now a wide range of international securities are settled through them including many types of sovereign debt and equity securities.

==== Dematerialisation ====
Dematerialisation involves dispensing with paper instruments and certificates altogether. Dematerialised securities exist only in the form of electronic records. The legal impact of dematerialisation differs in relation to bearer and registered securities respectively.

=== Direct holding systems ===
In a direct holding system, participants hold the underlying securities directly. The settlement system does not stand in the chain of ownership, but merely serves as a conduit for communications of participants to issuers.

== Settlement period ==
The terms T+1, T+2, etc., are a shorthand for "trade date plus one day", "trade date plus two days", etc., indicating how many business days after a security transaction occurs that the trade must be settled. Rules or customs in financial markets for securities transactions provide for this 'settlement period', which is the mandated time for official transfer of securities to the buyer's account and the cash to seller's account. Following that cycle has been titled the regular way or a regular way contract. The most common current settlement period for securities transactions is one business day after the day of a transaction, which is abbreviated to T+1. On settlement, the seller must produce the security's certificate and executed share transfer form in exchange for payment from the purchaser. Many countries now dispense with the requirement that a physical stock certificate be produced, a process known as dematerialization, and have adopted electronic settlement systems.

=== History ===
During the 1700s the Amsterdam Stock Exchange had close links with the London Stock Exchange and they would often list each other's stocks. To clear the trades, time was required for the physical stock certificate or cash to move from Amsterdam to London and back. This led to a standard settlement period of 14 days which was the time it usually took for a courier to make the journey on horseback and by ship. Most exchanges continued to use the same model over the next few hundred years.

Settlement procedures varied considerably across national stock markets. There were two main types of settlement period used by different countries, either a fixed number of days after the transaction known as fixed settlement lag or periodically on a fixed date when all transactions up to that date are settled known as fixed settlement date. In France, Italy, and, to some extent, Switzerland and Belgium, as well as some developing countries, the settlement of all transactions took place once a month on a fixed date. This system was instituted by Napoleon. The last day of trading on which all trades are settled was called the liquidation. The liquidation took place on the seventh business day preceding the end of the calendar month.

In the United States, the New York Stock Exchange used T+1 in the 1920s, and the American Stock Exchange used T+2 prior to 1953. These settlement periods were gradually extended to T+5 by the late 1960s as brokerage firms became overwhelmed by the massive volume of securities transactions paperwork awaiting settlement.

==== T+3 ====
The Black Monday (1987) stock market crash prompted a move to reduce settlement times. Settlement dates in most exchanges reduced to three days (T+3).

==== T+2 ====
In 2017, the move by most stock exchanges was towards adoption of T+2 (trade date plus two days). For example, the United Kingdom adopted T+2 in October 2014 and the United States adopted T+2 in September 2017.

==== T+1 ====
Indian stock exchanges planned a move to T+1 starting in 2022. The US and Canada targeted a transition to T+1 early in 2024. Canada adopted T+1 beginning on May 27, 2024, as did Argentina, Jamaica, Mexico, and the US on the following day. Chile, Colombia, and Peru are slated to move to T+1 in 2025, and ESMA recommended the EU transition to T+1 on October 11, 2027.

=== Operation ===
Under a one-day settlement rule (T+1), settlement occurs on the business day following the transaction date. Saturday, Sunday and public holidays are not market business days. For example, if a transaction occurs on a Friday, the payment or check must arrive at the broker's office by the close of business on Monday, unless a public holiday delays the settlement day.

The rationale for the delayed settlement is to give time for the seller to get documents to the settlement and for the purchaser to clear the funds required for settlement.

=== Application ===
The one-day settlement period (T+1) applies to most security transactions, including stocks, bonds, municipal securities, mutual funds traded through a brokerage firm, and limited partnerships that trade on an exchange. Two-day settlement has been the convention in the off-exchange foreign exchange market well before exchanges moved to this convention.

Government securities, stock options, and options on futures contracts settle on the next business day following the trade or T+1. Futures contracts themselves settle the day of the trade.

== See also ==
- Settlement risk
- CLS Group
- CREST
- Failure to deliver
- Regular way contracts
- Securities uniform rules (United States)
- Subprime mortgage crisis
- T2S – being developed harmonised settlement platform in Europe
