= Registered share =

Share recorded in the owner's name

A registered share is a stock that is registered to the name of the exact owner. If the owner of such a share sells their share, the new owner must register with their name and other personal information such as address and birthdate.

Registered shares offer the issuer the advantage of always knowing who exactly their shareholders are. Surprises with active investors could be prohibited with this stock-vehicle.

== Registered ownership and street name holding ==
A registered shareholder is recorded on the issuer's books, usually through records maintained by a transfer agent. Transfer agents record changes of ownership, maintain the issuer's security holder records, cancel and issue certificates, and distribute dividends.

Registered shares differ from securities held in "street name". In street name registration, securities are registered on the issuer's books in the name of an intermediary, such as a broker, while the investor is recorded as the beneficial owner on the intermediary's records.

== See also ==
- Book-entry
- Dematerialization (securities)
- Insider trading
- Stock transfer agent
