= Stada Arzneimittel =

German pharmaceutical company

STADA Arzneimittel AG
- Company type: Aktiengesellschaft
- Traded as: FWB: SAZ
- Industry: Pharmaceuticals
- Founded: Dresden, 1895
- Headquarters: Bad Vilbel, Germany
- Key people: Peter Goldschmidt (CEO), Simone Berger (CHRO), Miguel Pagan Fernandez (CTO), Boris Döbler (CFO), Günter von Au (Chairman of the supervisory board)
- Products: Generic, over-the-counter drugs, Specialty Pharmaceuticals
- Revenue: €3.79 billion (2022)
- Number of employees: 13,183 (FTE, as of December 31, 2022)
- Subsidiaries: Pymepharco
- Website: www.stada.com

Stada Arzneimittel AG is a pharmaceutical company based in Bad Vilbel, Germany which specializes on a three-pillar strategy consisting of consumer healthcare products (over-the-counter drugs), generics and specialty pharma. Worldwide, STADA Arzneimittel AG sells its products in approximately 120 countries. In 2022, revenue totaled €3.79 billion.

Commonly known products produced by Stada are Stada-brand acetaminophen and lactulose, Grippostad-C cold medicine, cough syrup Silomat and Ladival sun protection products. Stada is involved in various charity projects and sponsoring activities which include the support for dolphin aid e.V since 2007 and the support of a Romanian children's village in Timișoara.

== History ==
=== Foundation & early history ===
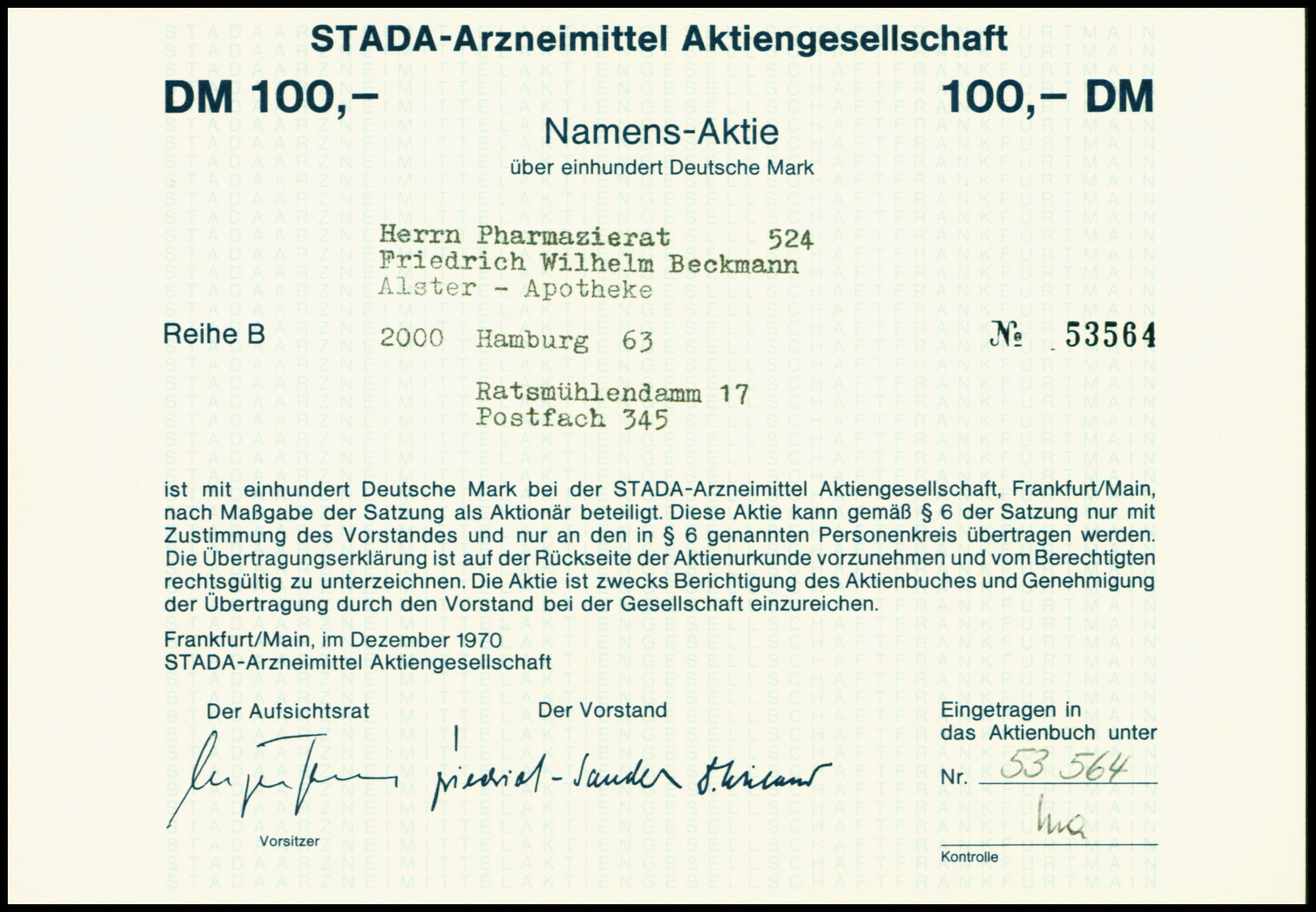
Share of the Stada Arzneimittel AG, issued December 1970

Stada was founded in Dresden in 1895 as a cooperative pharmacy. Stada was originally an acronym for Standardarzneimittel Deutscher Apotheker (Standard Drugs (of) German Pharmacists). After World War II, the company was relocated to Essen and Tübingen. In 1956 it was moved again to Bad Vilbel and in 1970, Stada began trading on the stock exchange as a public company. At that time the shares were restricted to pharmacists as restrictedly transferable registered shares. Five years later, Stada entered the generic drug market.

=== Public float, 1993–2018 ===
In 1999 Stada's German subsidiary, NIDDApharm GmbH, entered the German generic drugs market – worth an estimated 300 million DM.

In September 2000, the company executed a 1:10 share split on the S-MAX. In October the company entered into an agreement with Montenegro Group to acquire the pharmaceutical products of the "Bonomelli Farmacia" product line, rolling into the company's Italian subsidiary, EG S.p.A. – Laboratorie Eurogenerici.

In July 2001 the company acquired the American generic drug supplier MOVA Laboratories Inc.

In April 2002 the company acquired Spanish pharmaceutical company Bayvit S.A from Bayer and Vita S.A. Bayvit is the second-largest supplier of generic drugs in Spain, with recorded sales in 2000 of €20 million. In May, the company acquired Marketing and Sales Operations of the Italian pharmaceutical company Crinos SpA, rolling it into the Italian subsidiary EG SpA. In September the company established a joint venture in Brazil: Ava Stada Pharma Latin America Ltda, 51% owned by Stada and 49% owned by Brazilian company AVA Industrial S/A. In November of the same year, the company acquired an increase shareholding in Ciclum Farma S.A., from 50% to 74%, with Grünenthal GmbH taking over the remaining 26% of shares.

In January, 2003, the company announced its intention to acquire the majority interest in the Italian pharmaceutical company, Pharmajani SpA. Pharmajani specialises in the distribution of pharmacy products, expanding the company's operations and significantly strengthening the distribution capabilities of Stada's Italian subsidiaries, EG SpA and Crinos SpA. The company will change its name to New Pharmajani SpA (NPA). In October the company acquired Schein Pharmaceutical Holdings UK Ltd and its subsidiary Schein Pharmaceutical UK Ltd from Schein Pharmaceutical (Bermuda) Ltd, a subsidiary of US-based Watson Pharmaceuticals, Inc. for €17 million.

In August 2004 the company acquired 97.47% of the shared of Nizhpharm OJSC for between €80.5 million.

In April 2005, the company acquired Portuguese generics supplier Ciclum Farma, Unipessoal LDA for €31 million. In May, the company acquired the majority 58% stake in Chinese pharmaceuticals manufacturing company Beijing Center-Lab Pharmaceutical Company Ltd via its subsidiary Stada Pharmaceuticals (Asia) Ltd for €3.5 million. The deal will also strengthen Health Vision Enterprise Ltd, which is 51% owned by the company.

In July 2006, the company sold US subsidiary Stada Inc. to Dava Pharmaceuticals Inc. for $40 million (€31 million). Later in the same month, the company offered to acquire Serbian pharmaceutical group Hemofarm for €485 million (€146.97 per share) – marking Stada's largest acquisition to date.

In August 2007 Stada's Russian subsidiary Nizhpharm OAO, acquired Makiz Group and its associated subsidiaries: Zzo Makiz-Pharma, Zzo Skopinpharm and Zzo Biodyne Pharmaceuticals for €125 million. In the same month the company acquired Forum Bioscience Holdings Ltd for £37.7 million (€55.6 million).

In November 2011, the company acquired the generics division of Spirig Pharma AG for CHF 97 million (€78 million)

In August 2013 the company completed the acquisition of UK-based over-the-counter manufacturer Thornton & Ross for £221.1 million (€259.2 million).

In November 2016 Stada UK Holdings acquired Natures Aid, a manufacturer of vitamins, minerals, food supplements.

=== Bain Capital & Cinven ownership, 2018–present ===
In late 2016 into 2017, the company was approached by a number of potential acquirers. In February 2017, Boston private equity outfit Advent International made the first public and binding bid for the drugmaker, with a €58 per share in cash ($3.7 billion in total), in addition to a 2016 dividend payment. In March 2017, it emerged that a number of other suitors had come to the fore; CVC Capital Partners – who helped the company dodge pressure from an activist investor in 2016 in tandem with either China's Fosun Pharmaceutical or Shanghai Pharmaceuticals Holding. It also emerged that Mylan and big pharma Merck & Co had been working with Credit Suisse on formulating a potential offer.

In April 2017, it was reported that Bain Capital and Cinven tabled a bid valuing the company at about €5.3 billion (£4.5 billion). The private equity consortium offered €65.28 a share and a dividend of €0.72 per Stada share. On June 27, 2017, Reuters reported that the Bain-Cinven bid to acquire the company had failed after only gaining 65.52% of shares. This was below the 67.5% minimum threshold needed to secure the acquisition. In August 2017, Bain Capital and Cinven successfully acquired Stada Arzneimittel.

=== Overview ===
The following is an illustration of the company's mergers, acquisitions, spin-offs and historical predecessors:

- Stada Arzneimittel AG
  - NIDDApharm GmbH
  - Stada UK Holdings
    - Schein Pharmaceutical Holdings UK Ltd
      - Schein Pharmaceutical UK Ltd
        (Acq 2003)
    - Forum Bioscience Holdings Ltd
    - Thornton & Ross
      (Acq 2013)
    - Natures Aid
      (Acq 2016)
  - EG S.p.A
    - Crinos SpA
    - Pharmajani SpA
  - Stada Inc.(Sold 2006)
    - MOVA Laboratories Inc.
    - Ava Stada Pharma Latin America Ltda
  - Bayvit S.A
    - Ciclum Farma, Unipessoal LDA
  - Nizhpharm OAO
    - MAKIZ Group
      - ZAO MAKIZ-Pharma
      - ZAO Skopinpharm
      - ZAO Biodyne Pharmaceuticals
  - Stada Pharmaceuticals (Asia) Ltd
    - Beijing Center-Lab Pharmaceutical Company Ltd
    - Health Vision Enterprise Ltd

=== Executive history ===
Matthias Widenfels resigned as chief executive officer (CEO) in January 2017 for "personal reasons"; he was replaced on an interim basis by Engelbert Coster Tjeenk Willink. Claudio Albrecht became CEO in September 2017, shortly after the company's acquisition by Cinven and Bain Capital. Peter Goldschmidt, head of Sandoz North America, will succeed Albrecht as CEO in September 2018, while Albrecht will remain with the company in a non-executive position.

The company's supervisory board was at one time headed by Carl Ferdinand Oetker. By 2018, Günter von Au had taken this role.
