= Street name (disambiguation) =

A street name is an identifying name given to a street or road.

Street name may refer to:

- A synonym for a moniker
- Street name securities
