= United States v. O'Hara =

The United States of America v. Jerome O'Hara and George Perez
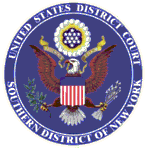
- Court: United States District Court for the Southern District of New York
- Citation: Not specified

Case history
- Subsequent action: Not specified

Court membership
- Judge sitting: Debra C. Freeman (Federal Magistrate Judge)

Case opinions
- Not applicable as the case is ongoing

The United States of America v. Jerome O'Hara and George Perez (S.D.N.Y., No. 09-mag-2484) is a federal court case for the ongoing trial of Jerome O'Hara and George Perez, two computer programmers who previously worked for Bernard L. Madoff Investment Securities LLC (BLMIS) until the arrest of the company's chairman, Bernard Madoff, on December 11, 2008.

The order to issue arrest warrants for O'Hara and Perez was signed on November 12, 2009, by federal magistrate judge Debra C. Freeman. The next morning, FBI agents arrested O'Hara at his home in Malverne, New York and Perez at his home in East Brunswick, New Jersey, and charged them each with conspiracy to falsify books and records, falsifying books and records of a broker–dealer, and falsifying books and records of an investment advisor (IA). The U.S. Securities and Exchange Commission also served them with civil charges.

At their bail hearing, federal prosecutor Preet Bharara said: "The computer codes and random algorithms they allegedly designed served to deceive investors and regulators and concealed Madoff's crimes." The attorney for O'Hara, Gordon Mehler, said "We intend to enter a plea of not guilty", and the attorney for Perez, Larry Krantz, declined to comment. Federal magistrate judge Ronald L. Ellis set the bail at $1 million with travel restrictions.

== Background ==
O'Hara and Perez began working for BLMIS in 1990 and 1991, respectively.

Prosecutors claim that in April 2006, the two men tried to delete 218 computer programs from an IBM server known internally as "House 17". According to the SEC, the programs, among other things, outputted volumes of fake trade blotters, stock records, Depository Trust Corporation (DTC) reports and other phantom books and records to substantiate nonexistent trading. The filenames containing the programs were often prefixed with "SPCL", which stood for "special".

The FBI and SEC said that later in August or September 2006, O'Hara and Perez withdrew hundreds of thousands of dollars from their personal BLMIS accounts before informing Madoff that they no longer wished to lie for him.

=== The Ponzi scheme ===
According to the FBI, from at least as early as the 1980s through to December 11, 2008, Madoff, Frank DiPascali, and others perpetrated a scheme to defraud clients of the BLMIS IA corporation by accepting billions of dollars of clients' funds under false pretenses, promising to invest the funds for the clients. Instead, they failed to invest the funds and created and distributed false documents that purported to show that the funds had been invested, when they hadn't. Allegedly, they also lied to the SEC and an accounting firm to cover up the fraudulent scheme.

Madoff solicited, and caused others to solicit, prospective clients to open accounts with BLMIS by, among other things, promising to invest funds in common stock, options, and other securities in a way that would achieve high rates of return with little risk. They managed to establish thousands of accounts with BLMIS, representing individual investors, charities, trusts, pension funds, hedge funds, and corporations.

=== "Split Strike" strategy ===
DiPascali, under the direction of Madoff, created a purported investment strategy that was referred to as a "split strike conversion" ("Split Strike") strategy, and marketed this to clients beginning in or around the early 1990s. Clients whose funds were to be managed within the strategy were promised that:

1. Their funds would be invested in a pool of around 35–50 common stocks from the Standard & Poor's 100 Index (S&P 100)
2. The collection of stocks would mimic the price movements of the Index
3. The investments would be hedged by buying contracts related to those stocks, thereby limiting potential losses from unexpected changes in stock prices
4. Madoff would appropriately time the entry and removal of funds in this investment strategy
5. Funds that were not invested in stocks would be invested in money market funds and U.S.-issued securities such as U.S. Treasury bills.

Thousands of BLMIS clients were told that their funds, collectively worth billions, were invested within the Split Strike strategy.

Allegedly, Madoff and others created statements for the "Split Strike clients" that listed stocks in which their funds were supposedly invested. The reports falsely made it appear that the returns were approximately 10 to 17 percent per year.

Allegedly, DiPascali and others, in order to conceal the falsehood of the strategy, prepared several, model baskets of S&P 100 stocks, and tracked how these hypothetical baskets would have performed in the actual marketplace to determine what the clients would be told regarding when their funds had "entered the market". Data related to chosen baskets of securities would be entered into an IBM AS/400 server known as "House 17", which was dedicated primarily to the IA business. Madoff, DiPascali, and others used computer programs that were allegedly written by O'Hara and Perez to allocate pro rata multiples of the chosen basket, based on clients' purported account balances with BLMIS. These programs would output thousands of pages of fake documents that purported to confirm the purchase of stocks from the chosen basket. A similar process was used when funds were "removed from the market".

Because none of the purchases had actually occurred, Madoff, DiPascali, and others would allegedly price each stock at some chosen price from the range of prices which the stock was selling for on the day that the stocks were supposedly purchased. They supposedly chose a price that would make the trades, if they had actually happened, most favorable, but still making sure that the volume of trades of the stock on the day of the "trade" was sufficiently high as to not cause suspicion.

Allegedly, Madoff, DiPascali, and others oversaw the production and mailing of thousands of pages of account "statements" each month, which all falsely reflected securities transactions that had not occurred. According to the FBI, they would also routinely add lines representing additional, fictitious option trades for the purpose of making it appear that the accounts had achieved the targeted rate of return.

=== "Non-Split Strike clients" ===
At all times during the fraud, BLMIS had a number of clients who were not invested within the Split Strike strategy ("Non-Split Strike clients"). The non-Split Strike clients were told that their funds would be invested using strategies that would realize annual rates of return from at least 53 percent. From at least the early 1980s, Madoff and others allegedly took steps to make it appear as though their funds had generated these extraordinarily high returns, when, in fact, their funds had not been invested at all.

=== "House 05" and Stratus systems ===
The operations of the "Market Making" and "Proprietary Trading" businesses of BLMIS principally relied on two computer systems: a Stratus trading platform, and an IBM AS/400 server that was internally known as "House 05". The Stratus system was responsible for, among other things, effectuating the trading activities of BLMIS, and it communicated with third parties in connection with trades, in particular, by communicating with trading contra parties. Data was regularly transferred from the Stratus system to House 05.

Allegedly, O'Hara and Perez were very familiar with the back-end workings of the House 05 system, and, among other things, they wrote programs for House 05 that would:

1. Process data generated by the Stratus system
2. Enable communication with third parties including the Depository Trust Company
3. Obtain data from these third parties to be used in creating books and records
4. Assist BLMIS employees in finding discrepancies between the House 05 and Stratus systems by generating "break sheets".

According to the FBI, O'Hara and Perez were also responsible for maintaining House 05.

=== "House 17" ===
Another IBM AS/400 server, known internally as "House 17", was the principal computer system of the IA business. Unlike House 05, House 17 did not electronically receive trading data from third parties. Allegedly, all data on the House 17 system was generated by DiPascali and others in the IA business, who entered it into the House 17 server.

The FBI examined backup tapes and used testimony of DiPascali to conclude that O'Hara and Perez developed and maintained computer programs on the House 17 server that were used expressly for the purpose of entering fictitious trading data into the server. FBI agents claim that the House 17 computer programs were used to generate, among other things, thousands of pages of fake account statements, trade confirmations, trading blotters, and other books and records related to BLMIS's purported IA business.

== Charges ==
The United States formally charged O'Hara and Perez with:

- Count One – Conspiracy to Falsify Books and Records of a Broker–Dealer and to Falsify Books and Records of an Investment Advisor
- Count Two – Falsifying Books and Records of a Broker–Dealer
- Count Three – Falsifying Books and Records of an Investment Advisor

== Later Developments ==
in 2018, it was reported by CNBC that O'Hara had completed his sentence.
