= Share transmission =

Share transmission is a mechanism by which the title to shares is devolved other than by transfer. This is typically applicable for:

- devolution by death
- succession
- inheritance
- bankruptcy
- marriage

When a previous owner of shares dies and his shares are inherited by his personal representatives or heirs, this is called transmission of shares. Shares may be inherited only by production of probate of a will of the deceased owner or letters of administration of his estate granted by the High Court (section 148 of Companies and Allied Matters Act under Nigerian law). The beneficiaries of the shares by transmission must have their names entered in the register of members of the company or elect a nominee to hold the shares on their behalf. In this case the nominee’s name shall be entered in the Register of members of the company to become a member of the company (section 155 (3) of CAMA).

== Transfers on transmission of shares ==
Transmission of shares occurs when the shares of a deceased share holder are inherited or bequeathed to an heir or personal representative of the deceased shareholder. Where shares are held by two or more persons jointly then upon death of one or more of them, the surviving person shall be entitled to all the shares and they may be transferred to his name. Where the shareholder held the shares as a sole owner, then his shares may be transferred only to the person named in his will or if he died without a will, then to the person who obtains letters of administration from the High Court in respect of the shares or the deceased’s property (section 148 of CAMA). The above are in Law recognized as the personal representatives of the deceased share holder and are entitled to have his shares transferred to them or their nominee (section 155 of CAMA).

=== Protection of Beneficiaries under a will ===
Sometimes a deceased member may name some persons as the administrators of his estate who are to ensure the deceased’s properties are distributed and/or managed as stated in the will. These persons therefore inherit the deceased persons shares on behalf and for the benefit of those who are named in the will as the beneficiaries inherit. The administrators therefore only have an equitable right in the shares but not the beneficial rights. This right becomes a legal right only when the shares are transferred to those entitled under the will. It is the duty of the executors of the will who in this case are the personal representatives of the deceased to ensure that they nominate those entitled to the shares under the will as those to whom the shares should be transferred to (section 155 (3) of CAMA).

Any person claiming to have an interest in any shares or the dividends or interest on those shares may protect his interest by swearing to an affidavit indicating the nature of his interest and serving the company with the affidavit. The company shall then enter on the register of members the fact that such notice has been served on the company. The company shall therefore not register any transfer of shares of the deceased in respect of which it had received the affidavit of interest. Any company which receives this notice of interest and in default proceeds to register any transfer in favor of any other person shall be personally liable to the person who lodged the notice of interest for any loss he suffers thereby (section 156 of CAMA) The Company shall give notice of at least 42 days to any other person seeking a transfer to him, of the shares complained of, for the matter to be resolved otherwise, the proposed transfer will not be effected (section 156 (2) of CAMA).

Ownership: on registration of the transmission of shares, the person entitled to transmission of shares becomes the shareholder of the company and is entitled to all rights and subject to all liabilities as such shareholder.

Method: while transfer of shares is brought about by delivery of a proper instrument of transfer (viz, transfer deed) duly stamped and executed, transmission of shares is done by forwarding the necessary documents (such as a notarised copy of death certificate) to the company.

== Legal process ==
In the case of death. The surviving shareholders have to submit a request letter supported by an attested copy of the death certificate of the deceased shareholder and the relevant share certificates. The company’s registrar and share transfer agent on receipt of the said documents will delete the name of deceased shareholder from its records and return the share certificates to the applicant/registered holder with necessary endorsement.

== See also ==
- Stock certificate
- Share forfeiture
- Stock transfer agent
