= Omnibus Customer Securities Accounts =

An Omnibus Customer Securities Account is a securities account used by a brokerage firm or its affiliated clearing firm in order to maintain appropriate custody of underlying securities for the purpose of satisfying the custody obligations of the broker-dealer towards its customers.

Article 8 of the US Uniform Commercial Code provides for a standard settlement procedure for securities transfers to be effected by book entry when the underlying securities are registered in the name of the designated nominee of a securities intermediary. Article 8 also provides for multiple book-entry systems to act together to form a heavily intermediated securities holding chain known as an indirect holding system.

The term "Omnibus Account" is used by Federal Securities Regulations, such as the Customer Protection Rule from the U.S. Securities and Exchange Commission (SEC), which makes it a violation of federal regulations for a broker-dealer to fail to maintain an adequate number of securities to match the sum of fully paid securities entitlements the brokerage firm has issued to its customers.
