= Security segregation =

Separation of client and firm securities

Security segregation or client funds, in the context of the securities industry, refers to regulatory rules requiring that customer assets held by a financial institution (generally a brokerage firm) be held separate from assets of the brokerage firm itself in a segregated account and that there is no commingling.

Thus, for example, in the United States the law (in particular, the SEC's customer protection rule, Rule 15c3-3) generally requires that a broker must take steps to hold separately, in separate (segregated) accounts on the broker's books, securities it holds for its customers from securities of the broker itself. The purpose of the rule is: a) to limit the broker's use of customer securities to support the broker's own business activities; and b) to facilitate the prompt return of customer securities in the event of the broker's insolvency. In many jurisdictions segregated accounts cannot be used to pay creditors during a broker's liquidation and must be returned to the customers directly.

This securities segregation requirement was developed due to problems in the U.S. stock markets towards the end of the 1960s. At the time, there was not any requirement that brokers segregate client securities from the firm's own assets on the firm's books and records. When brokers went bankrupt, therefore, they were unable to return securities to their clients, inasmuch as they had not maintained accurate books and records of their clients' holdings. In the crisis of the late 1960s, a good portion of the net worth (capital) of brokerage houses was held in highly speculative common stocks which were owned by individual partners. When the bear market occurred, alongside contraction of these speculative common stock quotations, the net worth of these brokerage firms declined drastically hence leading to bankruptcy. The partners were speculating with clients' capital which was meant to protect them against financial hazards.

== See also ==
- Ponzi scheme
- Deposit insurance
- Trust account
- Securities account
