= Hemofarm =

Serbian pharmaceutical company

- Official logo
- Native name: Хемофарм
- Type: Joint-stock company
- Industry: Pharmaceuticals
- Founded: 28 August 1998 (current form); 1960 (founded)
- Headquarters: Beogradski put bb, Vršac, Serbia
- Key people: Ronald Seeliger (CEO)
- Products: Pharmaceuticals, Prescription drugs
- Revenue: ▲€337.37 million (2018)
- Net income: ▲€26.47 million (2018)
- Total assets: ▲€436.09 million (2018)
- Total equity: ▲€296.34 million (2018)
- Owner: STADA (100%)
- Number of employees: 3,134 (2018)
- Website: www.hemofarm.com

Hemofarm a.d. (full legal name: Hemofarm a.d. Farmaceutsko-hemijska industrija Vršac), a member of STADA Group, is a Serbian pharmaceutical company based in Vršac, Serbia. Founded in 1960, it is one of the largest domestic producers and exporters of medicines in Serbia. Hemofarm currently operates in more than 30 countries on 3 continents and has around 3,000 employees.

The core activity represents the manufacture of Rx and OTC medicines and products. The portfolio includes over 140 International Nonproprietary Names (INNs), with about 280 forms and dosage forms.

== History ==
Hemofarm was established on 1 June 1960 in Vršac. In 2003, it opened the first factory for the production of medicine in entity Republika Srpska, Bosnia and Herzegovina. As of 2003, Hemofarm consisted of 21 subsidiaries, 12 of which were located in Serbia and the rest in Montenegro.

In 2004, the company acquired four other Serbian pharmaceutical companies, increasing its market share from 15% to 45%. As of 2011, the company had a market share in terms of production and import of 30.7%.

Hemofarm was bought by the German STADA Arzneimittel pharmaceutical group for 480 million euros in 2006. Since 9 August 2009, Hemofarm has been a member of the German STADA Group.

In August 2016, Hemofarm bought the assets of a minor Serbian pharmaceutical company, "Ivančić i sinovi", for an undisclosed amount.

== Research and development ==
Hemofarm’s R&D division was established in 1990, and it has been recognized by STADA as a competence center for development of new generic products not only for local and regional markets, but also for the whole STADA Group. An intensive development of products intended for registration and sale in the demanding European Union market started in 2007.
