= Indirect holding system =

System of securities clearance, settlement and ownership system

The indirect holding system (also multi-tiered holding system) is a system of securities clearance, settlement and ownership system where ownership information is held electronically as a book entry. It consists of one or more tiers of intermediaries between issuer and investor. It is an evolution from the "direct holding system" in which owners of securities had a direct relationship with the issuer.

The system is made up of various tiers, often with an increasing number of entries involved in each of the tiers. The top tier comprises "national" and "international central securities depositories" (CSDs), where large pools of securities of different issuers are immobilized or otherwise concentrated.

The next tier consists of a limited number of financial institutions, brokers, depositories and other professional investors who have direct contractual relationships with the CSDs and who hold their interests in securities in book-entry accounts with a CSD. These intermediaries (sometimes called participants of the CSD) in turn, hold in their accounts interests in or in respect of securities either for themselves or for their customers, such as institutional or retail investors or further intermediaries, and so forth until accounts are held for the investors.

For reasons of efficiency, depositories that hold securities for investors generally do so through commingled omnibus customer accounts.

This structure allows the issuer to deal with a single entity, the CSD. The investors do not appear on any register of ownership maintained by or on behalf of the issuer, nor do they have actual possession of certificates. It is the "account" rather than the "certificates" that is the source of the investor's entitlement.

The system reduces the processing and settlement costs and risks of loss, theft, and counterfeiting associated with the direct holding system. The transfer of securities by mere accounting entries allows for the rapid and efficient disposition of those interests. The velocity of transactions has grown and continues to grow.

In most jurisdictions around the world, neither the substantive laws governing securities transactions nor the conflict of laws rules determining the law applicable to cross-border transactions have been updated adequately to deal with the indirect holding system. The concept of direct property rights, the basic legal model of ownership of the direct holding of securities, is difficult to apply in the indirect system. Under traditional legal principles, commingling fungible property terminates direct property rights of owners of the individual commingled items.

== See also ==
- Dematerialization (securities)
- Book entry
- Stock transfer agent
