= Passenger market =

A passenger market is a securities market where, due to regulation, securities are required to be held at the country's central securities depository in a separate account in the name of the beneficial owner. Compare this to a market such as the United States where most securities are held in street name, that is, in the accounts of the brokers or custodians rather than the clients.

An example of a passenger market is Bangladesh.

Some central depositories, such as CREST and CHESS, support but do not require individual membership. These are not considered passenger markets.
