= Global Custodian =

- Editor-in-Chief: Jonathan Watkins
- Categories: Trade journal
- Frequency: Five issues per year
- Circulation: 20,000-30,000 (2005)
- Publisher: Tungsten Publishing
- Founded: 1989
- Company: Tungsten Publishing
- Country: United Kingdom
- Language: English
- Website: www.globalcustodian.com
- ISSN: 1047-8736

The Global Custodian is a trade publication covering the international securities services industry. GlobalCustodian.com refers to the website of Global Custodian magazine, which provides daily news and events coverage of the securities services industry, particularly custodian banks, but also including fund administration, securities financing/lending, prime brokerage, private equity, derivatives and other related topics.

Published five times per year, Global Custodian magazine provides analysis and commentary on the latest news and events taking place in the international securities services industry. The magazine publishes a series of annual surveys. The magazine is the sister publication of The TRADE magazine.

== History ==
Founded in 1989 by Dominic Hobson and Charles Ruffel, the original focus of the magazine was on securities processing operations: articles that explore how shares trade and settle and are held. Its editorial scope has since expanded to include fund administration, securities lending and financing, prime brokerage and the infrastructure of the global securities industry (Central Securities Depositories or CSDs, International Central Securities Depositories or ICSDs, payments systems and other industry bodies and initiatives). The editorial content of the magazine is now also supported by surveys that address how the performance of custodian banks, fund administrators, prime brokers and tri-party securities financing providers compare with each other and within individual markets.

With its news coverage and digital offering, Global Custodian's major awards evenings are among its offerings - with a London Custody awards evening in March and a New York dinner honouring the leaders in hedge fund administration and prime brokerage during November.

Global Custodian operates a video platform called GCTV, launched in 2007, which has released documentaries about the securities services industry alongside its regular online news coverage.

In October 2015, Global Custodian appointed Jonathan Watkins as editor, joining from The TRADE. In 2018, Watkins and colleagues Daljit Sokhi and Richard Schwartz conducted a management buyout from previous owners Strategic Insight.

The publication is run out of London.

== Surveys ==
Each issue of GC magazine contains one or more annual survey reports, which rate financial institutions in various sectors of the securities services industry. Industry surveys carried by Global Custodian include:

- Agent Banks in Major Markets
- Agent Banks in Emerging Markets
- Agent Banks in Frontier Markets
- ETF Administration
- Hedge Fund Administration
- Mutual Fund Administration
- Prime Brokerage
- Private Equity Fund Administration
- Tri-Party Securities Financing

== See also ==
- Custodian bank
