= Depository Trust Company =

American financial company

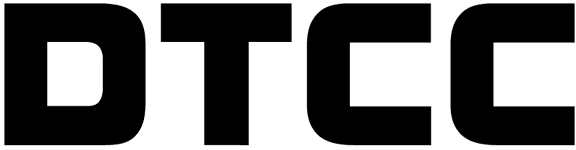
- Industry: Finance
- Founded: 1973; 53 years ago
- Headquarters: New York City, United States
- Area served: Worldwide
- Total assets: $114 trillion (2026)
- Parent: Depository Trust & Clearing Corporation
- Rating: Aaa (Moody's; 2020)
- Website: www.dtcc.com/about/businesses-and-subsidiaries/dtc

Depository Trust Company (DTC), founded in 1973, is a New York corporation that performs the functions of a central securities depository as part of the US National Market System. DTC annually settles transactions worth hundreds of trillions of dollars, processes hundreds of millions of book-entry deliveries, and custodies millions of securities issues worth tens of trillions of dollars issued in the United States and over 100 other countries. Since 1999 it has been a subsidiary of the Depository Trust & Clearing Corporation, a securities holding company.

DTC manages book-entry securities entitlement transfers for brokerage houses and maintains custody of global (jumbo) stock certificates and other stock certificates through its affiliated partnership nominee, Cede and Company. DTC maintains Omnibus Customer Securities Accounts for the account of the DTC Participant.

As of 2018, DTC was the world's second-largest CSD by value of securities held, behind the Federal Reserve System's Fedwire Securities Service and well ahead of Euroclear Bank.

== History ==
=== Background ===
==== 1960s Wall Street paperwork crisis ====
Before DTC and NSCC were formed, brokers settled trades by physically exchanging stock certificates—that is, hard copy documents which declared their holders to be the owners of so many shares of stock. The mechanisms brokers used to transfer securities and keep records relied heavily on pen and paper, and they employed hundreds of messengers to carry certificates and checks. The exchange of physical stock certificates was difficult, inefficient, and increasingly expensive. Before 1946, the SEC had allowed for T+2 settlement (that is, settlement within two days of the trade date), but by the early 1960s, this deadline had been lengthened to four days and then five.

In the late 1960s, with an unprecedented surge in trading leading to volumes of nearly 15 million shares a day on the NYSE in April 1968 (as opposed to 5 million a day just three years earlier, which at the time had been considered overwhelming), the paperwork burden became enormous. Stock certificates were left for weeks piled haphazardly on any level surface, including filing cabinets and tables. Stocks were mailed to wrong addresses, or not mailed at all. Overtime and night work became mandatory. Back office worker turnover was 60% a year.

To help brokerage firms catch up on the overwhelming volume of paperwork, the stock exchanges were forced to close every week (they chose every Wednesday), and trading hours were shortened on other days of the week.

==== Industry response ====
The first response was to hold all paper stock certificates in one centralized location, and automate the process by keeping electronic records of all certificates and securities clearing and settlement (changes of ownership and other securities transactions).

One problem was state laws requiring brokers to deliver certificates to investors. Eventually all the states were convinced that this notion was obsolete and changed their laws. For the most part, investors can still request their certificates, but this has several inconveniences, and most people do not, except for novelty value.

This led the New York Stock Exchange to establish the Central Certificate Service (CCS) in 1968 at 44 Broad Street in New York City. Anthony P. Reres was appointed the head of CCS. NYSE President Robert W. Haack promised: "We are going to automate the stock certificate out of business by substituting a punch card. We just can't keep up with the flood of business unless we do". The CCS transferred securities electronically, eliminating their physical handling for settlement purposes, and kept track of the total number of shares held by NYSE members. This relieved brokerage firms of the work of inspecting, counting, and storing certificates. Haack labeled it "top priority", $5 million was spent on it, and its goal was to eliminate up to 75% of the physical handling of stock certificates traded between brokers. One problem, however, was that it was voluntary, and brokers responsible for two-thirds of all trades refused to use it.

By January 1969, it was transferring 10,000 shares per day, and plans were made for it to be handling broker-to-broker transactions in 1,300 issues by March 1969. In 1970 the CCS service was extended to the American Stock Exchange. This led to the development of the Banking and Securities Industry Committee (BASIC), which represented leading U.S. banks and securities exchanges, and was headed by a banker named Herman Beavis.

=== Founding ===
Established in 1973, The Depository Trust Company (DTC) was created to alleviate the rising volumes of paperwork and the lack of security that developed after rapid growth in the volume of transactions in the U.S. securities industry in the late 1960s. DTC was formed under the special incorporation laws of New York for trust companies.

It was headed by William (Bill) T. Dentzer Jr., a former U.S. intelligence community member and New York State Banking Superintendent. All the top New York banks were represented on the board, usually by their chairman. BASIC and the SEC saw this indirect holding system as a "temporary measure", on the way to a "certificateless society".

Bill Dentzer was Chairman and CEO from 1973 to 1994. He was succeeded by William F. Jaenike, who was Chairman and CEO from 1994 to 1999.

In 1999, DTC became a subsidiary of the new Depository Trust & Clearing Corporation.

Today, all physical shares of paper stock certificates are held by a separate entity, Cede and Company.

== Functions ==
DTC participants own the non-voting stock of DTC. Depository Trust & Clearing Corporation owns all of the voting stock in DTC, which makes DTC a subsidiary of Depository Trust & Clearing Corporation.

DTC is not itself the holder of record of the securities for which it manages the custody. Instead, DTC designates Cede and Company as their main custodial nominee pursuant to New York's Uniform Commercial Code, Article 8: Investment Securities. Cede and Company's partners are employees of DTC.

In 2007, DTC settled transactions worth $513 trillion, and processed 325 million book-entry deliveries.

In addition to settlement services, DTC retains custody of 3.5 million securities issues, worth about $73 trillion, including securities issued in the United States and more than 170 other countries.

== DTC Eligibility ==
Stocks held by DTC are kept in the name of its partnership nominee, Cede and Company. Not all securities are eligible to be settled through DTC ("DTC eligible").

DTC eligibility means that a company's stock is eligible for deposit with DTC aka "Cede and Company." A company's security holders will be able to deposit their particular shares with a brokerage firm. Clearing firms, as full participants with DTC, handle the DTC eligibility submissions to DTC. Transfer agents were responsible for eligibility coordination years ago. Now, in order to make a new issue of securities eligible for DTC's delivery services, a completed and signed eligibility questionnaire must be submitted to DTC's Underwriting Department, Eligibility. Parties that may submit the questionnaire include one of the following: Lead Manager/Underwriter, Issuer's financial advisor or the DTC Participant clearing the transaction for its correspondent. The Lead Manager/ Underwriter must ensure that DTC's Underwriting Department receives the issue's offering document (e.g., prospectus, offering memorandum, official statement) and the CUSIP numbers assigned to the issue within the time frames outlined in DTC's Operational Arrangements.

FAST processing is functionality that can be turned on for issuers who are fully DTC eligible. Participation in FAST (Fast Automated Securities Transfer) allows issuers, security holders and brokerage / clearing firms to move stock electronically between one another. Transfer agents, as limited participants, file for FAST participation. DTC approves each issuer on a merit review basis into this system.

== "Chills and freezes" ==
Occasionally a problem may arise with a company or its securities on deposit at DTC. In some of those cases DTC may impose a "chill" or a "freeze" on all the company's securities. A "chill" is a restriction placed by DTC on one or more of DTC's services, such as limiting a DTC participant's ability to make a deposit or withdrawal of the security at DTC. A chill may remain imposed on a security for just a few days or for an extended period of time depending upon the reasons for the chill and whether the issuer or transfer agent corrects the problem. A "freeze" is a discontinuation of all services at DTC. Freezes may last a few days or an extended period of time, depending on the reason for the freeze. If the reasons for the freeze cannot be rectified, then the security will generally be removed from DTC, and securities transactions in that security will no longer be eligible to be cleared at any registered clearing agency. Chills and freezes are monitored by DTC's Office of Regulatory Compliance.

DTC imposes chills and freezes on securities for various reasons. For example, DTC may impose a chill on a security because the issuer no longer has a transfer agent to facilitate the transfer of the security or the transfer agent is not complying with DTC rules in its interactions with DTC in transferring the security. Often this type of situation is resolved within a short period of time.

Chills and freezes can be imposed on securities for more complicated reasons, such as when DTC determines that there may be a legal, regulatory, or operational problem with the issuance of the security, or the trading or clearing of transactions involving the security. For example, DTC may chill or freeze a security when DTC becomes aware or is informed by the issuer, transfer agent, federal or state regulators, or federal or state law enforcement officials that an issuance of some or all of the issuer's securities or transfer in those securities is in violation of state or federal law. If DTC suspects that all or a portion of its holdings of a security may not be freely transferable as is required for DTC services, it may decide to chill one or more of its services or place a freeze on all services for the security. When there is a corporate action, DTC will temporarily chill the security for book-entry activities. In other instances, a corporate action can cause a more permanent chill. This may force the issuer to reapply for eligibility altogether.

When DTC chills or freezes a security, it will issue a "Participant Notice" to its participants. These notices are publicly available on DTC's website. When securities are frozen, DTC also provides optional automated notifications to its participants. These processes provide participants the ability to update their systems to automatically block future trading of affected securities, in addition to alerting participant compliance departments. DTC has information regarding these processes on its website.

== See also ==
- National Securities Clearing Corporation
- Fixed Income Clearing Corporation
- Securities clearing and depository institutions
