= Custodian bank =

Financial institution providing safekeeping and securities services

A custodian bank, or simply custodian, is a specialized financial institution responsible for providing securities services. It provides post-trade services and solutions for asset owners, asset managers, banks and broker-dealers. Custodial banks do not engage in traditional commercial or retail banking services like lending.

Custodian banks provides a wide range of value-adding or cost-saving financial services, such as fund administration, transfer agency, securities lending, and trustee services.

== Definition ==
Custodian banks are often referred to as global custodians if they safe keep assets for their clients in multiple jurisdictions around the world, using their own local branches or other local custodian banks ("sub-custodian" or "agent banks") with which they contract to be in their "global network" in each market to hold accounts for their respective clients. Assets held in such a manner are typically owned by larger institutional firms with a considerable number of investments such as banks, insurance companies, mutual funds, hedge funds and pension funds.

== History ==
=== Early history ===
In 1961, U.S. President John F. Kennedy established a Committee on Corporate Pension Plans. Two years later, Studebaker Auto Manufacturer shuttered its business and operations, and it failed to provide pensions to the approximately 7,000 employees affected. Hence, in 1974, U.S. President Gerald Ford proposed an Employee Retirement Income Security Act (ERISA Act), protecting the employee benefit plans' standards.

Since the Act has become effective, employers could not hold and keep their pension fund assets. Instead, they are obligated to appoint external custodians to safekeep the assets. Also, they are required to appoint trustees and depositories to ensure the pension funds are operated in the best interest of the pension holders and aligned to the investment mandates.

== Further developments ==
Banks have developed a wide range of custody and related services (securities services), and have been developing new technologies (e.g. blockchain, API, distributed ledger) and aligning with the fast-moving regulatory requirement, such as digital assets.

== Client segments and products ==
The securities services industry mainly serves two types of clients: 1) Asset Owners & Managers and 2) Banks, Brokers & Dealers.

=== Asset owners and managers ===
The client segment of Asset Owners & Managers includes asset management companies, alternative asset managers, insurance companies, pension funds, sovereign wealth funds, central banks, family offices and prime brokers.

The bank may offer the following products & services:

Product / Service	Description
Global Custody	Safekeeping and administration of assets of clients, for instance, asset managers & owners, in multiple markets. They serve as the first point of contact for their global clients. However, they may not have such a strong network in every jurisdiction in which the clients want to invest. Hence, the global custodian needs to appoint and manage direct custodians which have existing securities services infrastructure in some individual markets.
Fund Administration	Fund accounting and valuation services across different fund types and structures by using the bank's integrated fund accounting platform. For example, offering Net asset value (NAV) and portfolio holding etc. reports and financial reporting support. Usually, ETF services also fall under the scope of fund admin.
Transfer Agency	Handling fund subscription and redemption for funds like mutual funds and ETFs. Also, to conduct shareholder servicing and recordkeeping for dividend payout purpose.
Securities lending	Lending of securities from one party to another for a limited period of time, in exchange for a lending fee and collateral. The objective of securities lending is to enhance the liquidity in the secondary market especially for benchmark or actively traded securities by providing mechanisms to increase market liquidity, market making activities and also to enhance the return on portfolio investment.
Middle Office Outsourcing	Offers technical solutions and post-trade execution operational services. For example, portfolio management tools such as portfolio management, pre-trade compliance and order management. Also, trade Management functions like trade confirmation and dissemination of settlement instructions, and investment operational function, investment record-keeping, reconciliation, pricing, CA processing, derivatives processing etc. It helps the fund houses to decrease operational costs and risks.
Treasury Products	Provides cash management solution for idle cash of fund managers and also FX solutions for securities transactions.
Collateral Management	Banks can optimize financial institutions' collateral portfolios with internal analysis tools and flexible two-way/three-way solutions. A number of global banks can make better use of their global capabilities to help FI manage one-stop global or onshore collateral, and meet complex financing and liquidity needs.
Trustee Services	Act as a separate third-party function to oversight and monitor the fund manager investment compliance and also its service providers' responsibilities.

=== Banks, brokers and dealers ===
The client segment of banks, brokers and dealers includes global custodians, banks, brokers and dealers.

The bank may offer the following products and services:

Product / Service	Description
Direct Custody & Clearing	A Direct custodian offers custody services in their local markets. Global custodians are their focused clients as direct custodians can offer knowledge and experience of the markets and industry, and close relationships with the local regulators in the local market, which the global custodian might lack but require. Therefore, it is responsible for the safekeeping and administration of assets of clients, for instance, asset managers & owners, in a local market.
Third Party Clearing	The TPC model enables easier access to the cash market through segregation of trading and clearing participantships.
Account Operators	The AO model allows local and cross-border broker-dealers to outsource their securities back-office operations to the custodian bank, which will act on behalf of broker-dealer clients in the clearing and settlement of trades executed on the exchange while clients will continue to handle all front-office related activities such as research, trading and investor servicing.

== Importance of custodian ==
Using US definitions, a person who owns street name securities and who is not a member of an exchange holds the securities through a registration chain which involves one or more custodians. This is due to the perceived impracticality of registering traded securities in the name of each individual holder; instead, the custodian or custodians are registered as the holders and hold the securities in a fiduciary arrangement for the ultimate security holders. However, the ultimate security holders are still the legal owners of the securities. They are not merely beneficiaries of the custodian as a trustee. The custodian does not become at any point the owner of the securities, but is only a part of the registration chain linking the owners to the securities. Global securities safekeeping practices vary substantially, with markets such as the UK, Australia and South Africa encouraging designated securities accounts in order to permit shareholder identification by companies.

The definition of shareholder is generally upheld by corporate law rather than securities law. One role of custodians (which may or may not be enforced by securities regulation) is to facilitate the exercise of share ownership rights, for example and processing dividends and other payments, corporate actions, the proceeds of a stock split or a reverse stock split, the ability to vote in the company's annual general meeting (AGM), information and reports sent from the company and so forth. The extent to which such services are offered are a function of the client agreement together with relevant market rules, regulations and laws.

== Industry profile ==
=== Industry size ===
As of end-2023, the market size (as measured by worldwide client assets under custody and/or administration) amounted to some $230 trillion. The market share of the largest global custodians has varied quite dramatically over the past 25 years

As of 2022, the market size (as measured by revenue) of the Custody, Asset & Securities Services industry in the US is $32.5bn, with a YoY 2.9% growth between 2017 and 2022.

=== Industry players ===
Many investment banks and banks offer securities services. Generally, the division of securities services is either grouped with Global Markets to form a larger umbrella of Markets & Securities Services (MSS) or falls under the umbrella of Corporate Banking or Transaction Banking.

For instance, Citi and HSBC restructured and combined their Global Markets and Securities Services divisions in 2019 and 2020 respectively.

Players include (in alphabetical order):

- (France) BNP Paribas: Securities Services
- (United States) BNY: Securities Services
- (United States) Citi: Markets & Securities Services
- (France) Crédit Agricole: CACEIS Investor Services
- (Germany) Deutsche Bank: Corporate Banking
- (United Kingdom) HSBC: Markets & Securities Services
- (United States) J.P. Morgan: Markets & Securities Services
- (Japan) Mizuho: Institutional Services
- (United States) Morgan Stanley: Fund Services
- (Japan) MUFG: Investor Services
- (United States) Northern Trust: Asset Servicing
- Royal Bank of Canada: Investor & Treasury Services
- (Japan) SMBC: Custody and Securities Services
- (France) Société Générale: Global Markets and Investor Services
- (United Kingdom) Standard Chartered: Financial Markets
- (United States) State Street: Asset Servicing

=== Industry ranking ===
==== Global ====
According to the Asset under Custody League Table as of Q4 2025 by Global Custodian, custodian banks' assets under custody and/or administration (AUC/AUA) are:

Company	AUC/AUA (US$)
(United States) BNY	59.3 trillion
(United States) State Street	58.3 trillion
(United States) JPMorgan Chase	41.1 trillion
(United States) Citi	31.4 trillion
(France) BNP Paribas	20.5 trillion
(United States) Northern Trust	18.7 trillion
(United Kingdom) HSBC	15.5 trillion
(United States) U.S. Bancorp	12.3 trillion
(France) CACEIS	11.3 trillion
(France) Societe Generale	7.1 trillion
Royal Bank of Canada	2.1 trillion

==== Regional ====
According to the Global Custody Survey 2020 by Global Investor Group, the top custody regional players are:

Region	Bank Name
Americas	(United States) JPMorgan Chase
Asia-Pacific	(United Kingdom) HSBC
Europe, Middle East, and Africa (EMEA)	(United Kingdom) HSBC

== Notable industry acquisitions ==
=== 2000 to 2010 ===
In November 2002, State Street announced that it had acquired global custody business with assets under custody of approximately €2.2 trillion of Deutsche Bank's Global Securities Services (GSS) business for $1.5 billion, subject to adjustment.

In July 2003, HSBC announced the agreement to acquire 82.19% of Korean fund administrator Asset Management Technology (AM TeK) for $12.47 million in cash, which was the biggest fund administrator in South Korea, with $24 billion of assets under administration.

In August 2003, U.S. Bancorp acquired corporate trust business of State Street for $725 million.

In October 2004, Citi acquired ABN AMRO's direct custody, securities clearing, and fund services businesses in selected European and Asian markets for around $50 million.

In November 2005, U.S. Bancorp announced that it was purchasing the corporate trust and institutional custody businesses of Wachovia Corporation.

In July 2006, HSBC announced that it was acquiring Westpac sub-custody operations in Australia and New Zealand for $112.5 million, making the British bank the leading sub-custody and clearing player in Australia and New Zealand.

In July 2007, the merger between Bank of New York and Mellon Financial Corporation had been finalised to create BNY Mellon, which is the largest custodian and asset servicer with more than $18trn in assets under custody and administration at that time.

In July 2007, State Street confirmed that it was acquiring Investors Financial Services for $4.2 billion.

Also in July 2007, the French bank BNP Paribas announced an acquisition of a minority stake of 33.4% in the capital of SLIB, which had been a 100% subsidiary of Natixis prior to the acquisition.

In November 2009, J.P. Morgan Chase acquired ANZ's custodian services business, including access to more than 100 clients and US$90.71 billion in assets under custody.

In April 2010, Standard Chartered acquired Barclays African custody business, which had assets under custody of $3.8 billion.

One month later, in May 2010, State Street announced the completion of its acquisition of Intesa Sanpaolo's Securities Services business (ISPSS) for €1.28 billion in cash.

=== 2011 to 2020 ===
In April 2013, Citi announced that it was acquiring ING Group's Custody and Securities Services Business in Central and Eastern Europe with €110 Billion in assets under custody. In the same month, Standard Chartered acquired custody business in South Africa from Absa Bank.

In February 2018, Butterfield Bank announced that it was purchasing Deutsche Bank's Global Trust Solutions business in the Cayman Islands, Jersey and Guernsey.

In March 2020, Citi announced that it was buying Royal Bank of Canada's custody business in Australia.

=== Since 2021 ===
In January 2021, U.S. Bancorp acquired the debt servicing and securities custody services client portfolio of MUFG Union Bank, with approximately 600 client relationships and $320 billion in assets under custody and administration.

In September 2021, State Street announced that it was acquiring Brown Brothers Harriman's Investor Services business, including its custody, accounting, fund administration, global markets and technology services, for $3.5 billion in cash. However, in November 2022, State Street and BBH announced the termination of this transaction.

In January 2022, Standard Chartered announced an agreement to acquire 100% ownership of RBC Investor Services Trust Hong Kong Limited from RBC Investor & Treasury Services, expanding its custodian business to MPF and ORSO schemes trusteeship business in Hong Kong.

In July 2023, CACEIS, previously jointly owned by Crédit Agricole and Banco Santander at that time, purchased RBC Investor Services' activities in Europe. The acquisition expanded CACEIS's geographic footprint in Europe and included an operations centre in Malaysia with over 1,200 staff. Following the acquisition, CACEIS provided custody for approximately €5 trillion in client assets.

In November 2023, HSBC agreed to sell its hedge fund administration business in several markets, including Hong Kong, Singapore, Ireland, and Luxembourg to BNP Paribas’ Securities Services.

In December 2024, Crédit Agricole agreed to buy Banco Santander's 30.5% stake in custody and asset servicing entity CACEIS, giving the French lender full control of the business. The transaction, expected to complete in 2025, excludes CACEIS's Latin American joint venture, which remains jointly controlled. Credit Agricole had previously expanded its asset servicing business with the acquisition of RBC Investor Services' operations in 2023.

In June 2025, Huntington Bancshares announced the divestiture of its corporate trust and institutional custody business to Argent Institutional Trust Company (AITC). Post-transaction, AITC is responsible for more than $175 billion in client assets.

In June 2025, BNP Paribas Securities Services agreed to acquire the custody and depositary bank business of HSBC Germany. Implementation is expected to begin in early 2026 through a phased client migration. In July 2025, HSBC has announced the sales of its fund administration business in Germany, i.e. Internationale Kapitalanlagegesellschaft (INKA), to a fund managed by BlackFin Capital Partners.

In October 2025, State Street Corporation completed its acquisition of Mizuho Financial Group's global custody and related businesses outside Japan, representing approximately $580 billion in assets under custody and $24 billion in assets under administration. The deal includes Mizuho's offshore securities services in Luxembourg, the Cayman Islands, and the Bahamas.

== Self-directed retirement account custodians (US) ==
According to the Internal Revenue Code (IRC) in the US, various retirement accounts such as: Traditional IRAs, Roth IRA, SEP IRA, or 401k plan accounts require that a qualified trustee, or custodian, hold IRA assets on behalf of the IRA owner. The trustee/custodian provides custody of the assets, processes all transactions, maintains other records pertaining to them, files the required IRS reports, issues client statements, helps clients understand the rules and regulations pertaining to certain prohibited transactions, and performs other administrative duties on behalf of the self-directed retirement account owner.

Self-directed retirement account custodians (also known as "self-directed IRA custodians" or "self-directed 401k custodians") should not be confused with a custodian bank, which strictly provides safekeeping for securities. While a self-directed retirement account custodian can provide custody for securities, typically it will specialize in non-security assets, or alternative investments. Examples of alternative investments would be: Real Estate, precious metals, private mortgages, private company stock, oil and gas LPs, horses, and intellectual property. These types of assets require a specialization on the part of the custodian due to the complexity of the documentation required to keep the alternative investments in compliance with the IRC.

== Mutual fund custodian ==
A mutual fund custodian refers typically to a custodian bank or trust company (a special type of financial institution regulated like a "bank"), or similar financial institution responsible for holding and safeguarding the securities owned by a mutual fund. A mutual fund's custodian may also act as one or more service agents for the mutual fund such as being the fund accountant, administrator and/or transfer agent which maintains shareholder records and disburses periodic dividends or capital gains, if any, distributed by the fund. The vast majority of funds use a third party custodian as required by SEC regulation to avoid complex rules and requirements about self-custody.

A mutual fund retirement account (IRA, SEP etc.) custodian, however, refers to the plan administrator and recordkeeper such as noted above, which may not necessarily be the same institution providing custody services to the investments of the overall fund.

== See also ==
- Central securities depository – Depository holding financial securities
- Escrow – Arrangement for holding funds by a third party
- Custodial account – Financial account managed by a legal guardian for a beneficiary
- Securities market participants (United States) – United States financial participants
