= Direct holding system =

Traditional system of securities clearance

A direct holding system or direct registration system (DRS) is an arrangement for registering ownership of securities (or similar interests) whereby every final investor in the security is registered with a single entity (for example, the issuer itself, a CSD, or a registry).

In some countries, the use of a direct holding system is required by law.

The Direct Registration System (DRS) is an example of a direct holding system. DRS is a traditional system of securities clearance, settlement and ownership in which owners of securities have a direct relationship with the issuer. As implemented in the past, investors would either be recorded on the issuer's register or they would be in physical possession of bearer securities certificates.

== Electronic system in the US ==
In the 1990s, the U.S. Securities and Exchange Commission (SEC) working with the securities industry, developed a new form of, "direct holding system" that would allow both the speedy settlement of securities transactions and communication between shareholders and their companies. This new system was a type of book-entry direct registration system (DRS) operated by a stock transfer agent. This concept would allow any retail investor who wants his or her securities to be registered directly on the books of the issuer, but does not necessarily want to receive a certificate, to register those securities in book-entry form directly on the books of the issuer. DRS is not widely adopted by retail investors. Most retail stock ownership is accomplished through a broker, which is the registered shareholder in the eyes of the issuer. The use of DRS allows individual investors the status of direct shareholders of the issuer (rather than simply customers of a broker).

== Legal ramifications ==
In a system that used paper certificates for securities, the doctrine of lex loci rei sitae (the law of the place of location of the securities) was applied to determine the validity of certain rights in or transfers of securities. In the case of bearer securities, this is taken to be the law of the jurisdiction where the certificates actually are (e.g., in a pledge, where the recipient of the collateral takes possession of the securities certificate at the time of transfer). In the case of registered securities, the lex loci rei sitae is either the law of the issuer's jurisdiction or the law of the jurisdiction where the securities records of the issuer or its official recordholder are located at the time of transfer. In a system in which securities are mostly held indirectly through brokers and banks (as discussed above) or in which securities are evidenced mainly on accounts (referred to as "dematerialization") rather than by certificates, an alternative rule of "the law of the relevant intermediary" has come to be used. According to this rule, the law chosen in the account agreement with the financial institution that holds the account in which the securities are evidenced or the place where the office of the intermediary with which the account holder normally deals is the law used. This is the technique used in the Hague Convention on The Law Applicable to Certain Rights in Respect of Securities Held with an Intermediary, and also used in the Article 8, "Investment Securities" of the United States Uniform Commercial Code.

== See also ==
- Dematerialization (securities)
- Book entry
- Registered instrument
- Stock certificate
