= Securities account =

Type of financial account

A securities account, sometimes known as a brokerage account, is an account which holds financial assets such as securities on behalf of an investor with a bank, broker or custodian. Investors and traders typically have a securities account with the broker or bank they use to buy and sell securities.

Securities accounts can be of different types, such as a share account, options account, margin account or cash account. Securities accounts are typically treated as client funds, keeping them separate from the firm's funds. This separation meets the financial regulations of most countries.
