= Book entry =

System of tracking ownership of securities

Book entry is a system of tracking ownership of securities where no certificate is given to investors. Several terms are often used interchangeably with "book entry" shares including "paperless shares", "electronic shares", "digital shares", "digital stock certificates", and "uncertificated shares". Some of these terms have somewhat different connotations but, at least in the United States, state securities laws only recognize certificated and uncertificated shares. In the case of book-entry-only (BEO) issues, while investors do not receive certificates, a custodian holds one or more global certificates. Dematerialized securities, in contrast, are ones in which no certificates exist; instead, the security issuer, its agent or a central securities depository keeps records, usually electronically of who holds outstanding securities.

Most investors who use an online broker or even a regular full-service broker will have their shares held in book-entry form. This is generally convenient, as one does not have to preserve physical stock certificates, and can buy/sell securities without turning certificates in or having new ones issued. Also, replacement costs for certificates are high in case one loses them, while book-entry ownership can never be lost thanks to technological backups.

== Direct Registration System ==
On August 8, 2006, the SEC approved a rule changed by NASDAQ, NYSE and AMEX requiring all listed securities (except certain debt securities) to be eligible for a direct registration system ("DRS") as of March 31, 2008. DRS is an entirely electronic book-entry style system that does not involve physical stock certificates. The rule change does not eliminate physical certificates, but requires issuers to be eligible for entirely electronic recording of securities ownership.

== Private companies ==
Adoption of book-entry systems among private companies has lagged adoption among public companies, public company transfer agents, and broker-dealers. This may be due to a number of misunderstandings and challenges unique to private company security issuance but, regardless, data suggest adoption of book-entry systems among private companies is growing rapidly.
