= Dematerialization (securities) =

Shift in method for recording the ownership of securities

In finance and financial law, dematerialization refers to the substitution of paper-form securities by book-entry securities. This is a form of indirect holding system in which an intermediary, such as a broker or central securities depository, or the issuer (e.g., French system) holds a record of the ownership of shares usually in electronic format. The dematerialization of securities such as stocks has been a major trend since the late 1960s, with the result that by 2010 the majority of global securities were held in dematerialized form electronically.

== History ==
Although the phenomenon is ancient, since book-entry systems for recording securities have been noted from civilisations as early as Assyria in 2000 BC, it gained new prominence with the advent of computer technology in the late 20th century. Even during the period when paper certificates were popular, book-entry systems continued since many small firms could not afford printing secured paper-form securities. These book-entry securities were often held under the control of an attorney who acts as a notary to certify the existence of the securities, as well as their authenticity.

Since the 1960s, dematerialization has affected more and more listed companies in the United States and more recently in European Union, where dematerialized securities represent often more than 99% of the securities listed on regulated markets.

However, the phenomenon of dematerialization of securities issued by large firms is mostly undertaken via a Central Securities Depository, a national or regional institution holding the notary function, such as the Depository Trust Company (DTC) in the United States or Euroclear Group in the EU, which itself entrusts banks and investment firms to act as intermediaries between issuers and investors for the custody of these securities. Therefore, dematerialized securities are often referred as intermediated securities, in particular by the Unidroit convention on substantive rules for intermediated securities.

== See also ==
- Direct holding system
- Demat account
- TreasuryDirect (United States)
- Geneva Securities Convention
- Stock certificate
- Stock transfer agent
