= Indian Depository Receipt =

Financial instrument dominated in Indian rupee

Indian Depository Receipt (IDR) is a financial instrument denominated in Indian Rupees in the form of a depository receipt. The IDR is a specific Indian version of the similar global depository receipts.

It is created by a Domestic Depository (custodian of securities registered with the Securities and Exchange Board of India) against the underlying equity of issuing company to enable foreign companies to raise funds from the Indian securities Markets. The foreign company IDRs will deposit shares to an Indian depository. The depository would issue receipts to indian investors against these shares. The benefit of the underlying shares (like bonus, dividends etc.) would accrue to the depository receipt holders in India.

== History ==
IDR's are based on the original American depositary receipts that were first introduced in 1927 in the US.

The Ministry of Corporate Affairs of the Government of India, using section 642 read with section 605A had prescribed the Companies (Issue of Indian Depository Receipts) Rules, 2004 (IDR Rules) vide notification number GSR 131(E) dated February 23, 2004.

The rules for IDRs were operationalized by the Securities and Exchange Board of India (SEBI)—the Indian markets regulator in 2006. Operation instructions under the Foreign Exchange Management Act were issued by the Reserve Bank of India on July 22, 2009. The SEBI has been notifying amendments to these guidelines from time to time.

Standard Chartered PLC became the first global company to file for an issue of Indian depository receipts in India in 2010.

=== Standard Charter IDR Issue ===
Standard Chartered plc was the first foreign company to have publicly elicited interest in making an IDR issue in India. Standard Chartered CEO Peter Sands was quoted in the Indian media as saying the "IDR listing (is) to enhance StanChart's commitment to India."

In 2010, it was reported that Standard Chartered may be inching closer to an issue. "We have already got advisors and we will file for the IDR issue after our (India) results are published by March-end," said Neeraj Swaroop, Regional Chief Executive, India and South Asia of Standard Chartered. Patrick Hosking, financial editor of the Times reports that Standard Chartered (may) offer up to $750 million of new shares to Indians. but India’s top financial portal reported top officials as suggesting the amount could be anywhere between $500 million and $750 million.

This was follow up with reports cited, Standard Chartered Plc files DRHP to issue IDRs in India with SEBI on March 30, 2010.

Standard Charter expects to raise around $500–750 million (Rs 2,250-3375 crore) to grow its businesses globally.

Standard Chartered opened its IDR offering to Indian investors on May 25, 2010, as reported by BBC News. The price band for the offering is 100 (£1.47; $2.10) to 115 rupees per IDR. The bank, which makes most of its profits in Asia, will issue 240 million IDRs through the offer.

In an interview with NDTV India, Neeraj Swaroop, CEO - South Asia at Standard Chartered Bank, said that the decision to list in India through an Indian depository receipts (IDR) issue, was not about raising capital but it is about a message of commitment to India.

Standard Chartered fixed its issue price for Indian Depository Receipts at Rs 104 per unit. At this issue price, the bank will raise Rs. 2,490 crore ($530 million) by selling 24 crore IDRs. Every 10 IDRs represents one share of the bank.

The IDRs opened at the Bombay Stock Exchange and National Stock Exchange on June 11 2010.

== Eligibility to issue ==
The regulations relating to the issue of IDRs is contained in Securities and Exchange Board of India (Issue of capital and disclosure requirements) Regulations, 2009, as revised from time to time.

According to Clause 26 in Chapter III (“Provisions as to public issue”), the following are required of any company intending to make a public issue in India:

- it has net tangible assets of at least Indian rupee three crore in each of the preceding three full years (of twelve months each), of which not more than fifty per cent are held in monetary assets: Provided that if more than fifty per cent. of the net tangible assets are held in monetary assets, the issuer has made firm commitments to use such excess monetary assets in its business or project;
- it has a track record of distributable profits in terms of section 205 of the Companies Act, 1956, for at least three out of the immediately preceding five years: Provided that extraordinary items shall not be considered for calculating distributable profits;
- it has a net worth of at least INR one crore in each of the preceding three full years (of twelve months each);
- the aggregate of the proposed issue and all previous issues made in the same financial year in terms of issue size does not exceed five times its pre-issue net worth as per the audited balance sheet of the preceding financial year;
- if it has changed its name within the last one year, at least fifty per cent. of the revenue for the preceding one full year has been earned by it from the activity indicated by the new name.

Further, Clause 97 in Chapter X stipulates additional requirements from a foreign company intending to make an issue of IDRs: An issuing company making an issue of IDR shall also satisfy the following:

- the issuing company is listed in its home country;
- the issuing company is not prohibited to issue securities by any regulatory body;
- the issuing company has track record of compliance with securities market regulations in its home country.

== Issue Process ==
According to SEBI guidelines, IDRs will be issued to Indian residents in the same way as domestic shares are issued. The issuer company will make a public offer in India, and residents can bid in exactly the same format and method as they bid for Indian shares. The issue process is exactly the same: the company will file a draft red herring prospectus (DRHP), which will be examined by SEBI. The general body of investors will get a chance to read and review the DRHP as it is a public document, available on the websites of SEBI and the book running lead managers. After SEBI gives its clearance, the company sets the issue dates and files the document with the Registrar of Companies. In the next step, after getting the Registrar’s registration ticket, the company can go ahead with marketing the issue. The issue will be kept open for a fixed number of days, and investors can submit their application forms at the bidding centers. The investors will bid within the price band and the final price will be decided post the closure of the Issue. The receipts will be allotted to the investors in their demat account as is done for equity shares in any public issue. On 26 October 2010, SEBI notified the framework for rights issue of Indian Depository Receipts (IDRs). Disclosure requirement for IDR rights would more or less be in line with the reduced requirement applicable for domestic rights issue.

== Fungibility ==
The Indian depository Receipts shall not be automatically fungible into underlying equity shares of issuing company. IDR Holders can convert IDRs into underlying equity shares only with the prior approval of the Reserve Bank of India (RBI). Upon such exchange, individual persons resident in India are allowed to hold the underlying shares only for the purpose of sale within a period of 30 days from the date of conversion of the IDRs into underlying shares. SEBI has recently allowed shareholders to convert their depository receipts into equity shares of the issuer company and vice versa.

== Eligibility for investors ==
According to Sebi guidelines, the minimum bid amount in an IDR issue is Rs 20,000 per applicant. Like in any public issue in India, resident Indian retail (individual) investors can apply up to an amount of INR 2,00,000 and non-institutional investors (also called high-net-worth individuals) can apply above INR 1,00,000 but up to applicable limits.

== Reservations in IDR issues (clause 98, Chapter X) ==
According to current regulations, at least 50% of the Issue is to be allocated to qualified Institutional Buyers (QIBs), 30% of the issue to the retail individual investors and balance 20% of the issue to non-institutional investors and employees. The ratio of non-institutional investors and employees is at the discretion of the company to decide. The issue will fail if the company does not get QIB investors to the extent of 50% of the issue size.

== Taxation ==
Corporate lawyer Cyril Shroff of law firm Amarchand & Mangaldas & Suresh A. Shroff & Co. explain the tax implications.

IDRs would also help improve the Sharpe's ratio of domestic portfolios by reducing home bias, that is either rooted in mistakes on the part of fund managers or in capital controls, says Professor Ajay Shah of the Indira Gandhi Institute of Developmental Research.

== See also ==
- Government of India
- Securities and Exchange Board of India
- Reserve Bank of India
- European Depositary Receipt
- Cross listing
