= Victory Giant Technology =

Chinese PCB company

Victory Giant Technology (HuiZhou) Co., Ltd.
- Native name: 胜宏科技(惠州)股份有限公司
- Formerly: Shenghua Electronics
- Type: Public
- Traded as: SZSE: 300476; SEHK: 2476
- Industry: Semiconductor
- Founded: 2003; 23 years ago
- Founder: Chen Tao
- Headquarters: Huizhou, Guangdong, China
- Key people: Chen Tao (Chairman); Zhao Qixiang (President)
- Revenue: ▲CN¥10.73 billion (2024)
- Net income: ▲CN¥1.15 billion (2024)
- Total assets: ▲CN¥19.18 billion (2024)
- Total equity: ▲CN¥8.93 billion (2024)
- Website: www.shpcb.com

Victory Giant Technology (HuiZhou) Co., Ltd. (VGT; Chinese: 胜宏科技; pinyin: Shènghóng kējì) is a publicly listed Chinese company that engages in the provision of printed circuit boards (PCB).

It is known to be Nvidia's leading supplier of PCB for AI servers and graphics cards.

== Background ==
VGT was founded in 2006 by Chen Tao, a former soldier and civil servant who was previously a salesperson at a Taiwanese-owned PCB factory.

In 2015, VGT held its initial public offering and became a listed company on the Shenzhen Stock Exchange.

In 2019, Chen made the decision to establish VGT's High Density Interconnect (HDI) division. It was a bet on the complex, high-end boards needed for gaming graphics cards. The bet paid off as Victory Giant became a core supplier of Nvidia which included supplying its H-series AI accelerator cards.

In 2024, Victory Giant acquired Taiwanese competitor APCB's business in Thailand. Less than a year later, it was reported that VGT was on track to have its second factory up and running in Thailand.

In March 2025, VGT started constructing a factory in the Bac Ninh province of Vietnam. The project's estimated cost is $520 million.

In July 2025, VGT announced it planned to hold a secondary listing on the Hong Kong Stock Exchange.

In November 2025, Bloomberg News reported that shares of VGT had risen nearly 600% that year due to its ties with Nvidia and AI. VGT emerged as top in sales for AI and high-performance computing during that year.

On 21 April 2026, VGT listed on the Hong Kong Stock Exchange.
