= Clearing Corporation =

The Clearing Corporation
- Company type: Subsidiary
- Headquarters: Delaware
- Website: www.theice.com/clearing-corp

The Clearing Corporation (TCC, former CCorp) is "a Delaware corporation owned by 17 stockholders (which include banks Goldman Sachs, Deutsche Bank and Morgan Stanley, as well as inter-dealer brokers ICAP and GFI Group and German derivatives exchange Eurex), many of whom represent the world-wide derivatives marketplace participants and market makers."

In 2008, the Clearing Corporation and the Depository Trust & Clearing Corporation (DTCC) announced a credit default swap (CDS) public clearing facility that will be linked to DTCC's Trade Information Warehouse. On September 29, 2008, CCorp affirmed that the CDS clearing counterparty will launch by year-end.
