= Form F-6 =

Form F-6 is used in the United States to register financial depository shares represented by American depositary receipts (ADRs) issued by a depositary against the deposit of the securities of a foreign issuer. These are essentially shares of a foreign company traded on U.S. exchanges; however, the price/liquidity is not directly tied to the ADRs foreign counterpart because they are two separate entities trading on different exchanges.

Form F-6 is mandated under the Securities Act of 1933 and is specifically designed for the registration of depositary shares evidenced by ADRs. These ADRs are issued by a U.S. depositary bank against the deposit of securities of a foreign issuer. The form ensures that the ADRs comply with U.S. securities regulations, providing transparency and protection for investors.
