= Foreign currency convertible bonds =

Bonds issued in currency different from issuer's domestic currency, convertible to equity

Foreign currency convertible bonds (FCCBs) are a special category of bonds that are issued in currencies different from the issuing company's domestic currency. Corporates typically issue FCCBs to raise money in foreign currencies. These bonds retain all features of a convertible bond, making them attractive to both the investors and issuers.

These bonds are typically used issued by multinational corporations with a business scenario of globalisation, where they are constantly dealing in foreign currencies. They are popular in India with companies that are trying to raise funds in other currencies. FCCBs are quasi-debt instruments and tradable on stock exchanges. Investors are typically hedge fund arbitrageurs or foreign nationals.

== Accounting ==
FCCBs appear on the liabilities side of the issuing company's balance sheet.

Under International Financial Reporting Standards (IFRS) provisions, a company must mark-to-market the amount of its outstanding bonds.

The relevant provisions for FCCB accounting are International Accounting Standards: IAS 39, IAS 32 and IFRS 7.

== Maturity ==
FCCB are issued by a company which can be redeemed either at maturity or at a price assured by the issuer. In case the company fails to reach the assured price, bond issuer is to get it redeemed. The price and the yield on the bond moves on the opposite direction. The higher the yield, lower is the price.

Foreign currency convertible bonds are equity linked debt securities that are to be converted into equity or depository receipts after a specified period. thus a holder of FCCB has the option of either converting it into equity share at a predetermined price or exchange rate, or retaining the bonds.

== See also ==
- American depositary receipt
- Global Depository Receipts
