= Depository Trust & Clearing Corporation =

US financial infrastructure company

Coordinates: 40.7032°N 74.0091°W

- Type: Private
- Industry: Finance
- Genre: Holding company
- Founded: DTCC (1999) – holding company for DTC (1973) and NSCC (1976)
- Headquarters: 570 Washington Blvd; Jersey City, NJ, U.S.
- Number of locations: 10
- Key people: Kevin Kessinger, Non-executive Chairman; Frank La Salla, President and CEO
- Services: Financial
- Revenue: US$2,485,973,000 (2024)
- Net income: US$487,794,000 (2024)
- Total assets: US$122,618,719,000 (2024)
- Total equity: US$4,320,670,000 (2024)
- Owner: Banks, brokers
- Number of employees: 5,000
- Subsidiaries: NSCC; DTC; FICC; DTCC Deriv/SERV LLC; DTCC Solutions LLC; EuroCCP Ltd. DTCC Loan/SERV LLC; Warehouse Trust Company LLC; DTCC Derivatives Repository Ltd.
- Website: www.dtcc.com

The Depository Trust & Clearing Corporation (DTCC) is an American financial market infrastructure company that provides clearing, settlement and trade reporting services to financial market participants. It performs the exchange of securities on behalf of buyers and sellers and functions as a central securities depository by providing central custody of securities.

DTCC was established in 1999 as a holding company to combine the Depository Trust Company (DTC) and National Securities Clearing Corporation (NSCC). User-owned and directed, it automates, centralizes, standardizes, and streamlines processes in the capital markets. Through its subsidiaries, DTCC provides clearance, settlement, and information services for equities, corporate and municipal bonds, unit investment trusts, government and mortgage-backed securities, money market instruments, and over-the-counter derivatives. It also manages transactions between mutual funds and insurance carriers and their respective investors.

In 2022, DTCC settled the vast majority of securities transactions in the United States and $2.50 quadrillion in value worldwide, making it by far the highest financial value processor in the world. DTCC operates facilities in the New York metropolitan area, and at multiple locations in and outside the United States.

== History ==
DTCC was established in 1999 as a holding company to combine The Depository Trust Company (DTC) and National Securities Clearing Corporation (NSCC).

In 2008, The Clearing Corporation (CCorp) and The Depository Trust & Clearing Corporation announced CCorp members will benefit from CCorp's netting and risk management processes, and will leverage the asset servicing capabilities of DTCC's Trade Information Warehouse for credit default swaps (CDS).

On 1 July 2010, it was announced that DTCC had acquired all of the shares of Avox Limited, based in Wrexham, North Wales. Deutsche Börse had previously held over 76% of the shares. On 20 March 2017, it was announced that Thomson Reuters acquired Avox.

DTCC entered into a joint venture with the New York Stock Exchange (NYSE) known as New York Portfolio Clearing, that would allow "investors to combine cash and derivative positions in one clearinghouse to lower margin costs".

DTCC supported the Customer Protection and End User Relief Act (H.R. 4413; 113th Congress), arguing that it would "help ensure that regulators and the public continue to have access to a consolidated and accurate view of the global marketplace, including concentrations of risk and market exposure".

DTCC collateral requirements for brokerages created difficulty for users during the GameStop short squeeze.

In reaction to the 2022 Russian invasion of Ukraine, on March 3, 2022, DTCC blocked Russian securities from the Bank of Russia and The Ministry of Finance of the Russian Federation.

In December 2025, the Securities and Exchange Commission provided the DTCC with a no-action letter that allows the organization to hold and record tokenized equities and other real-world assets on blockchain networks. The authorization enables DTCC to deliver tokenization-related services on approved blockchains for a period of three years.

== Operations ==
=== DTC ===
The Depository Trust Company (DTC) was the original U.S. securities depository.

Established in 1973, it was created to reduce costs and provide efficiencies by immobilizing securities and making "book-entry" changes to show ownership of the securities. DTC moves securities for NSCC's net settlements, and settlement for institutional trades (which typically involve money and securities transfers between custodian banks and broker-dealers), as well as money market instruments. In 2022, DTC processed $2.5 quadrillion in transactions. In addition to settlement services, DTC retains custody of 3.5 million securities issues valued at $87.1 trillion, including securities issued in the United States and more than 170 other countries. DTC is a member of the U.S. Federal Reserve System, and a registered clearing agency with the Securities and Exchange Commission.

Most large U.S. broker-dealers and banks are full DTC participants, meaning that they deposit and hold securities at DTC. DTC appears in an issuer's stock records as the sole registered owner of securities deposited at DTC. DTC holds the deposited securities in "fungible bulk", meaning that there are no specifically identifiable shares directly owned by DTC participants. Rather, each participant owns a pro rata interest in the aggregate number of shares of a particular issuer held at DTC. Correspondingly, each customer of a DTC participant, such as an individual investor, owns a pro rata interest in the shares in which the DTC participant has an interest.

Because the securities held by DTC are for the benefit of its participants and their customers (i.e., investors holding their securities at a broker-dealer), frequently the issuer and its transfer agent must interact with DTC in order to facilitate the distribution of dividend payments to investors, to facilitate corporate actions (i.e., mergers, splits, etc.), to effect the transfer of securities, and to accurately record the number of shares actually owned by DTC at all times.

=== NSCC ===
The National Securities Clearing Corporation (NSCC) is the original clearing corporation, and provides clearing and serves as the central counterparty for trades in the U.S. securities markets. It was an outgrowth of multilateral netting, which led to the formation of the National Securities Clearing Corporation (NSCC) in 1976.

Established in 1976, it provides clearing, settlement, risk management, central counterparty services, and a guarantee of completion for certain transactions for virtually all broker-to-broker trades involving equities, corporate and municipal debt, American depositary receipts, exchange-traded funds, and unit investment trusts. NSCC also nets trades and payments among its participants, reducing the value of securities and payments that need to be exchanged by an average of 98% each day. NSCC generally clears and settles trades on a "T+1" basis. NSCC has roughly 4,000 participants, and is regulated by the U.S. Securities and Exchange Commission (SEC).

=== FICC ===
The Fixed Income Clearing Corporation (FICC) provides clearing for fixed income securities, including treasury securities and mortgage backed securities

FICC was created in 2003 to handle fixed income transaction processing, integrating the Government Securities Clearing Corporation and the Mortgage-Backed Securities Clearing Corporation. The Government Securities Division (GSD) provides real-time trade matching (RTTM), clearing, risk management, and netting for trades in U.S. government debt issues, including repurchase agreements or repos. Securities transactions processed by FICC's Government Securities Division include Treasury bills, bonds, notes, zero-coupon securities, government agency securities, and inflation-indexed securities. The Mortgage-Backed Securities Division provides real-time automated and trade matching, trade confirmation, risk management, netting, and electronic pool notification to the mortgage-backed securities market. Participants in this market include mortgage originators, government-sponsored enterprises, registered broker-dealers, institutional investors, investment managers, mutual funds, commercial banks, insurance companies, and other financial institutions.

=== Global Trade Repository ===
DTCC created Deriv/SERV LLC In 2003 to help resolve over the counter (OTC) derivatives challenges of the time. It provides automated matching and confirmation services for derivatives trades, including credit, equity, and interest rate derivatives. It also provides related matching of payment flows and bilateral netting services. Deriv/SERV's customers include dealers and buy-side firms from 30 countries. In 2006, Deriv/SERV processed 2.6 million transactions.

From 2006 this service was complemented by the Trade Information Warehouse (TIW), an infrastructure that records all credit derivatives transactions, such as credit default swaps. This proved specifically useful in September 2008 by helping authorities and market participants understand exposures to failing or fragile counterparties such as Lehman Brothers or AIG. Partly based on that experience, the G20 in 2009 decided to mandate derivatives trade reporting across all derivatives asset classes (interest rates, currencies, equity, credit, and commodities), with the reports collected by regulated Trade Repositories. The reporting mandate was subsequently enshrined in legislation in the respective jurisdictions, e.g. the Dodd–Frank Act in the U.S. and EMIR in the European Union.

In May 2011, the International Swaps and Derivatives Association selected DTCC to build up a global industry-wide infrastructure for interest rate derivatives to comply with the G20 mandate, and the service was started in December 2011. Further trade repositories were built in collaboration with EFETnet for commodity derivatives and with SWIFT for foreign exchange derivatives. The service was branded Global Trade Repository (GTR) in 2012. It was deployed that year in the U.S. under CFTC supervision, and in 2013 in Australia under ASIC supervision, Hong Kong as an agent of HKMA, Japan under FSA supervision, and Singapore under MAS supervision. In November 2013, DTCC obtained a license from ESMA to operate its trade repository in the European Union, based in London and starting in February 2014, and in 2019 that service was extended to Switzerland under FINMA supervision. From 2018, DTCC built up its GTR infrastructure to also support securities financing transaction reporting in the European Union under the EU Securities Financing Transactions Regulation (SFTR). In the wake of Brexit, DTCC created an EU entity based in Dublin, which ESMA registered as an EU trade repository in late 2020, which on 1 January 2021 took over part of the activity previously reported to the UK trade repository. In compliance with legislation in the individual jurisdictions, DTCC operates trade repositories under several legal entities across the world, but keeps the original vision of a globally integrated reporting utility.

In 2019, DTCC rebranded its derivatives and trade repository businesses, including the GTR and TIW, as Repository and Derivatives Services (RDS).

=== EuroCCP ===
European Central Counterparty (EuroCCP) used to be a European subsidiary of DTCC from 2008 to 2020. It provides equities clearing services on a pan-European basis. Headquartered in London, EuroCCP is a UK-incorporated Recognised Clearing House regulated by the UK's Financial Services Authority (FSA). In December 2019, EuroCCP announced it would be purchased by Cboe Global Markets.

EuroCCP began operations in August 2008, initially clearing for the pan-European trading platform Turquoise. EuroCCP has subsequently secured appointments from additional trading platforms and now provides central counterparty services for equity trades to Turquoise, SmartPool, NYSE Arca Europe and Pipeline Financial Group Limited. EuroCCP clears trades in more than 6,000 equities issues for these trading venues. In October 2009, EuroCCP began clearing and settling trades made on the Turquoise platform in 120 of the most heavily traded listed Depositary Receipts.

Citi Global Transaction Services acts as settlement agent for trades cleared by EuroCCP, which now provides clearing services in 15 major national markets in Europe: Austria, Belgium, France, Denmark, Germany, Ireland, Italy, Finland, Netherlands, Norway, Portugal, United Kingdom, Switzerland, Sweden and Spain. Trades are handled in seven different currencies: the Euro, British Pound, U.S. Dollar, Swiss Franc, Danish Krone, Swedish Krona, and Norwegian Krone.

=== Other operations ===
DTCC Solutions is DTCC's subsidiary, formerly named Global Asset Solutions, delivering information-based and business processing solutions relative to securities and securities transactions to financial intermediaries globally, such as Global Corporation Action Validation Service (GCA VS) and Managed Accounts Service.

GCA VS provides a centralized source of information about corporate actions, including tender offers, conversions, stock splits, and nearly 100 other types of events for equities and fixed-income instruments traded in Europe, Asia Pacific, and the Americas. In 2006, GCA VS processed 899,000 corporate actions from 160 countries. Managed Accounts Service, introduced in 2006, standardizes the exchange of account and investment information through a central gateway.

DTCC Learning provides financial, technology, and career training and educational services to the global financial industry.

Loan/SERV provides services to loan syndicates and agents.

Omgeo is a central information management and processing hub for broker-dealers, investment managers, and custodian banks. It provides post-trade, pre-settlement institutional trade management solutions for the securities clearance and settlement industry, processes over one million trades per day, and serves 6,000 investment managers, broker/dealers, and custodians in 42 countries. Omgeo was formed in 2001 as a joint venture between DTCC and Thomson Reuters combining various trade services previously provided by each of these organizations. In November 2013 DTCC bought back Thomson Reuters' interest in the firm, so it is now wholly owned by DTCC.

== Leadership ==
- William T. Dentzer Jr, DTC Chairman & CEO, 1973-1994
- William F. Jaenike, DTC Chairman & CEO, 1994-1999
- Jill M. Considine, DTC then DTCC Chairman & CEO, 1999-2006
- Donald F. Donahue, Chairman 2006-2011 and CEO 2006-2012
- Robert Druskin, Executive Chairman 2011-2015 and Non-executive Chairman 2015–2023
- Michael Bodson, President & CEO 2012-2022
- Frank La Salla, President & CEO since 2022
- Kevin Kessinger, Non-executive Chairman since 1 January 2024

The board was composed of 21 members as of 2019. Two board members are selected by "preferred shareholders" ICE and FINRA, while 14 are from international clearing market participants.

== See also ==
- China Central Depository & Clearing
- China Securities Depository and Clearing Corporation
- Clearstream
- CREST (securities depository)
- Euroclear
- Korea Securities Depository
- LCH (clearing house)
- National Settlement Depository (Russia)
- Stock transfer agent
- CCP Global
- Americas Central Securities Depositories Association
