= Eastern Poland =

Macroregion of Poland

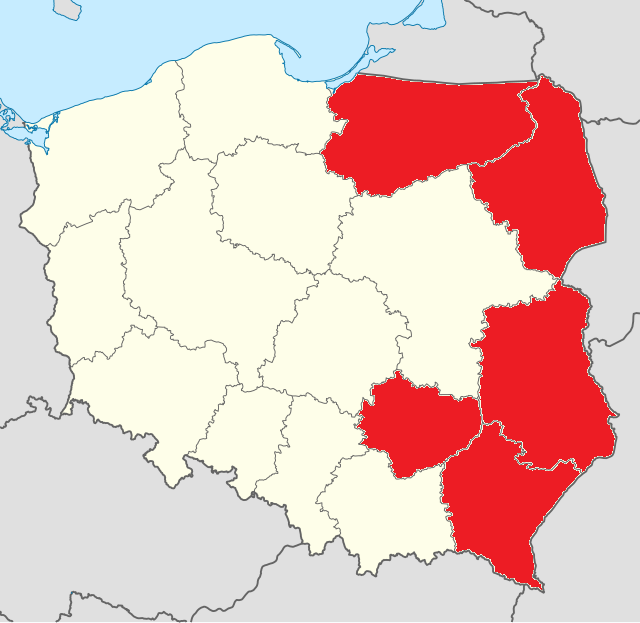
Map of the five voivodeships of "Eastern Poland." Masovian Voivodeship is excluded: even though it is in the eastern part of Poland, it is comparatively wealthy and contains the capital, Warsaw.

Eastern Poland (Polish: Polska Wschodnia) is a macroregion in Poland comprising the Lublin, Subcarpathian, Podlaskie, Świętokrzyskie, and Warmian-Masurian voivodeships.

The make-up of the distinct macroregion is based not only of geographical criteria, but also economical: in 2005, these five voivodeships has the lowest GDP per capita of any subdivisions in the European Union. On this basis, the macroregion is subject to special additional support with European funds under the Eastern Poland Economic Promotion Programme over 2007–2013.

In 2012–2013, the macroregion was the subject of an advertising campaign, Why didn't you invest in Eastern Poland?, which was to raise awareness of and increase investment in the region.

== Largest cities ==
Cities with over 50,000 inhabitants (as of 2023):

1. Lublin
2. Białystok
3. Rzeszów
4. Kielce
5. Olsztyn
6. Elbląg
7. Suwałki
8. Ostrowiec Świętokrzyski
9. Zamość
10. Łomża
11. Ełk
12. Chełm
13. Mielec
14. Przemyśl
15. Stalowa Wola
16. Biała Podlaska
