= Pay as you go (credit derivatives) =

PAUG ("Pay As You Go") refers to application of credit derivatives technology to structured finance products. It works similarly to a credit default swap (CDS) with the reference entity being a structured finance product such as ABS, commercial mortgage-backed security (CMBS), residential mortgage-backed security (RMBS), etc. The trigger events in PAUG can be classified mainly as “credit events” and “floating rate payment events”. PAUG is a settlement methodology for CDS on ABS reference entities.

== Credit events in PAUG ==
- Failure to Pay Principal – The Ref Ob fails to make scheduled principal payments.
- Writedown – The Ref Ob writes down (decreases) its outstanding principal amount.
- Distressed Ratings Downgrade – Distressed Ratings Downgrade is an optional credit event which is triggered when the reference obligation is downgraded to 'Caa2/CCC' or below, or the rating is withdrawn by one or more of the three rating agencies.

== Floating rate payment events ==
Interest Shortfall – The Ref Ob pays interest less than the expected interest for that period.

Writedown – The Ref Ob writes down (decreases) its outstanding principal amount

Principal Shortfall – The Ref Ob fails to make schedule principal payments

== Settlement mechanism ==
Credit Events (Failure to pay Principal, Writedown, Distressed Downgrade): A Notice of Settlement usually can be sent by the buyer only if the event is deemed to be a "credit event" by the buyer; the intent is to physically settle. The Buyer of protection has the option to physically settle or cash settle- if the Buyer chooses to physically settle, the a credit event has occurred.

Floating Rate Payment Events (Failure to pay Principal, Interest Shortfall, Writedown): A Notice of settlement can be sent by the calculation agent and/or the buyer of protection for failure to pay principal and writedown. The difference between this being a credit event and a floating rate payment event is that when an event occurs, the buyer chooses to cash settle and the trade continues (pay as you go). Interest shortfall is not considered a credit event in any instance, and is always cash settle.
