= Polish Investment and Trade Agency =

Coordinates: 52.2138°N 21.0228°E

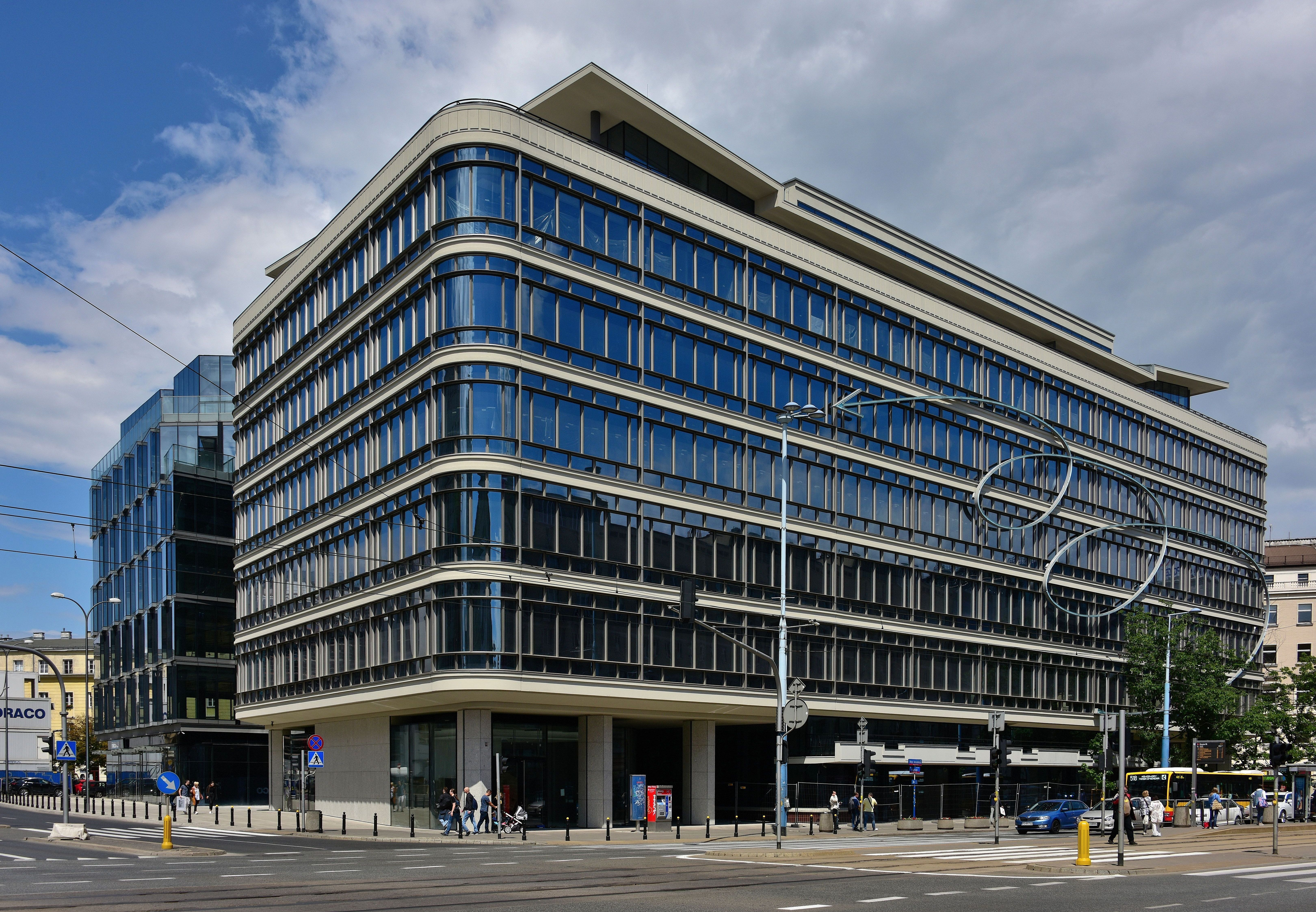
Headquarters of the Polish Investment and Trade Agency at 50 Krucza Street in Warsaw.

The Polish Investment and Trade Agency (Polish: Polska Agencja Inwestycji i Handlu, abbreviated to PAIH) is a Polish government agency which promotes Poland as an attractive destination for foreign investment.

== History ==
In 1992, the Polish Agency for Foreign Investment (PAIZ) was created, which in 2003 was merged with the Polish Information Agency (PAI) to form the currently named Polish Information and Foreign Investment Agency (PAIiIZ) to co-ordinate the promotion of Poland as an attractive destination for foreign investment. In 2017 the Agency change the name to Polish Investment and Trade Agency (PAIH)

== Role ==
Aside from the promotion of Poland for economic investment, PAIH also assists investors to overcome the administrative and legal hurdles that one must jump over when investing in Poland. The agency conducts investor surveys to determine the outlook of the investment climate in Poland. Its reports occasionally inform initiatives pursued by the Ministry of Economy.

== See also ==
- Why didn't you invest in Eastern Poland?
