= Recovery swap =

In finance, recovery swaps, recovery locks, or recovery default swaps (RDS) are derivative contracts related to credit default swaps, and reference a bond issuance as its underlying. They are designed to provide a hedge against the uncertainty of recovery in default.

The International Swaps and Derivatives Association does not keep records on the size of the recovery swap market because there has not yet been sufficient member demand.

== Terms ==
A recovery swap is an agreement between two parties to swap a real recovery rate (whenever it is ascertained) with a fixed recovery rate that can be locked in today. The parties are speculating on whether a company that is no longer liquid will pay out more or less than a certain percentage for each bond. The reference price is set to the fixed recovery rate rather than 100, chosen such that the RDS prices at zero on issue. Since the swap is issued at a price of zero, if the reference entity does not default in the term of the swap, then the swap expires with no cashflows having taken place.

Because the swap only has value (to either counterparty) during a default, the main market in RDS involves bonds that pose a high risk of default, when the reference entity (company) is in financial difficulty.

== Connection to fixed recovery CDS ==
A related instrument is a fixed recovery CDS. In theory an RDS protection (receive fixed recovery) can be approximated by buying protection with fixed CDS (binary CDS) and selling the ordinary CDS (writing protection). In reality there may be a slight difference in the terms of the swaps, particularly relating to settlement. It is usually the case that fixed recovery CDS are settled immediately, since there is no need to wait for recovery to be determined, whereas a recovery swap will wait until the ordinary CDS is settled before paying out.
