= Trade Information Warehouse =

The Trade Information Warehouse is a service offering of the Depository Trust & Clearing Corporation's Deriv/SERV, and is described by DTCC as "a centralized and secure global infrastructure for processing over-the-counter (OTC) derivatives over their life cycle".

It is purported to be the security industry's only repository and centralized post-trade infrastructure for servicing OTC credit derivative contracts throughout their multi-year lifecycles, and is expected to be involved in the newly created public clearing facility of credit default swaps in conjunction with CCorp.
