= European depositary receipt =

A European depositary receipt (EDR) represents ownership in the shares of a non-European company that trades in European financial markets. The EDR is issued by a bank in Europe representing stocks traded on an exchange outside of the bank’s home country.

The stock of some non-European companies trade on European stock exchanges like London Stock Exchange through the use of EDRs. EDRs enable European investors to buy shares in foreign companies without the hazards or inconveniences of cross-border and cross-currency transactions. EDRs can be issued in any currency, but euro is the most common currency for this type of security. If the EDR is issued in euros, it pays dividends in euros and can be traded like the shares of European companies.

== See also ==
- Depositary receipt
- American depositary receipt
- Global depositary receipt
- Cross listing
