= Global depository receipt =

Security representing ownership of an underlying number of shares of a foreign company

A global depository receipt (GDR and sometimes spelled depositary) is a general name for a depositary receipt where a certificate issued by a depository bank, which purchases shares of foreign companies, creates a security on a local exchange backed by those shares. They are the global equivalent of the original American depositary receipts (ADR) on which they are based. GDRs represent ownership of an underlying number of shares of a foreign company and are commonly used to invest in companies from developing or emerging markets by investors in developed markets.

Prices of global depositary receipt are based on the values of related shares, but they are traded and settled independently of the underlying share. Typically, 1 GDR is equal to 10 underlying shares, but any ratio can be used. It is a negotiable instrument which is denominated in some freely convertible currency. GDRs enable a company, the issuer, to access investors in capital markets outside of its home country.

Several international banks issue GDRs, such as JPMorgan Chase, Citigroup, Deutsche Bank, and The Bank of New York Mellon. GDRs are often listed in the Frankfurt Stock Exchange, Luxembourg Stock Exchange, and the London Stock Exchange, where they are traded on the International Order Book (IOB).

== Characteristics ==
1. It is an unsecured security
2. It may be converted into number of shares
3. Interest and redemption price is public in foreign agency
4. It is listed and traded on the stock exchange
5. Holders of a GDR do not carry any voting rights

== Usage ==
If for example an Indian company which has issued ADRs in the American market wishes to further extend it to other developed and advanced countries such as in Europe, then they can sell these ADRs to the public of Europe and the same would be named as GDR. GDR can be issued in more than one country and can be denominated in any freely convertible currency.

== See also ==
- American Depositary Receipt
- European depositary receipt
- Indian Depository Receipt
- Cross listing
