= Cross listing =

Listing of equity on both domestic and foreign stock exchanges

Cross-listing (or multi-listing, or interlisting) of shares is when a firm lists its equity shares on one or more foreign stock exchange in addition to its domestic exchange. To be cross-listed, a company must thus comply with the requirements of all the stock exchanges in which it is listed, such as filing.

Cross-listing should not be confused with other methods that allow a company's stock to be traded in two different exchanges, such as:

- Dual listed companies, where two distinct companies (with separate stocks listed on different exchanges) function as one company.
- Depositary receipts, which are only a representation of the stock, issued by a third-party bank rather than by the company itself. However, in practice the two terms are often used interchangeably.
- Admitted for trading, where a foreign share is accessible in a different market through an exchange convention and not actually registered within that different market.

Generally such a company's primary listing is on a stock exchange in its country of incorporation, and its secondary listing(s) is/are on an exchange in another country. Cross-listing is especially common for companies that started out in a small market but grew into a larger market. For example, numerous large non-U.S. companies are listed on the New York Stock Exchange or NASDAQ as well as on their respective national exchanges such as BlackBerry, Enbridge, Equinor, Ericsson, Nokia, Toyota and Sony.

== Difference with Depository Receipts ==
Depository Receipts (DR) are instruments derived from another underlying instrument while Multi-listed instruments represent the actual stock of a company. DR are convertible back to ordinary shares, following a process dependent upon the sponsoring facility that created the instrument. Ownership of a DR does not convey the same rights as a direct holder of equity shares, but in most cases the DR is convertible back into the original instrument through a process of conversion. The DR receive a different ISIN number, recognizing that they are not the same fungible instrument as the underlying stock. Popular DR include American Depositary Receipts (ADR), European Depositary Receipts (EDR), global depository receipts (GDR, also referred to as international depository receipts), and Global Registered Shares (GRS).

Multi listed or cross-listed shares, by contrast, are technically the same financial instrument. Fungibility is a concern across markets. For example, shares of IBM cannot be purchased on NYSE and sold, same-day, on the London Stock Exchange, even though IBM is cross listed in both markets. There is a re-registration process that must occur to move the number of outstanding shares from one jurisdiction to the other. This is primarily due to market inefficiencies and structures required to maintain the integrity of registered shares within specific jurisdictions (typically regulatory driven).

When a company decides to cross-list, the stock is technically fungible between exchanges. Royal Dutch Shell, IBM, and Siemens are all examples where the same issue is traded in multiple markets. However, in Frankfurt and Paris, they are traded in EUR, London in GBP, and on NYSE in USD. Prices are subject to local market conditions, as well as FX fluctuations and are not kept in perfect parity between markets. They tend to be more liquid than ADRs, GDRs and those types of conventions. While 'technically' fungible, these separate primary listings (they would all be considered 'primary' listings) are subject to re-registration which creates significant settlement risk if an investor wants to buy on one exchange and sell in another (especially where the currencies differ).

== Difference with admitted for trading ==
Shares traded in a true cross listing / multi listed scenario are processed, matched and settled via the market mechanisms specific to the local exchange. In this regard, even though shares of IBM bought on NYSE and shares of IBM purchased on LSE are technically the same instrument, those purchased on NYSE will settle via the mechanisms associated with NYSE and the DTCC in the United States. Those shares purchased on the LSE will settle via the mechanisms of the LSE and CREST in the United Kingdom.

Shares 'admitted for trading', such as IBM listed via ARCA in Frankfurt, will settle via DTCC. IBM is also cross-listed in Frankfurt, in which case, those transactions will settle via the local German market processes.

== Motivations for cross-listing ==
The academic literature has identified a number of different arguments to cross-list abroad in addition to a listing on the domestic exchange. Roosenboom and Van Dijk (2009) distinguish between the following motivations:

- Market segmentation: The traditional argument for why firms seek a cross-listing is that they expect to benefit from a lower cost of capital that arises because their shares become more accessible to global investors whose access would otherwise be restricted because of international investment barriers.
- Market liquidity: Cross-listings on deeper and more liquid equity markets could lead to an increase in the liquidity of the stock and a decrease in the cost of capital.
- Information disclosure: Cross-listing on a foreign market can reduce the cost of capital through an improvement of the firm's information environment. Firms can use a cross-listing on markets with stringent disclosure requirements to signal their quality to outside investors and to provide improved information to potential customers and suppliers (for example, by adopting US GAAP). Also, cross-listings tend to be associated with increased media attention, greater analyst coverage, better analysts’ forecast accuracy, and higher quality of accounting information.
- Investor protection ("bonding"): Recently, there is a growing academic literature on the so-called "bonding" argument. According to this view, cross-listing in the United States acts as a bonding mechanism used by firms that are incorporated in a jurisdiction with poor investor protection and enforcement systems to commit themselves voluntarily to higher standards of corporate governance. In this way, firms attract investors who would otherwise be reluctant to invest.
- Other motivations: Cross-listing may also be driven by product and labor market considerations (for example, to increase visibility with customers by broadening product identification), to facilitate foreign acquisitions, and to improve labor relations in foreign countries by introducing share and option plans for foreign employees.

== Costs of cross-listing ==
There are, however, also disadvantages in deciding to cross-list: increased pressure on executives due to closer public scrutiny; increased reporting and disclosure requirements; additional scrutiny by analysts in advanced market economies, and additional listing fees. Some financial media have argued that the implementation of the Sarbanes-Oxley act in the United States has made the NYSE less attractive for cross-listings, but recent academic research finds little evidence to support this.

== Value creation of cross-listings ==
There is a vast academic literature on the impact of cross-listings on the value of the cross-listed firms. Most studies (for example, Miller, 1999) find that a cross-listing on a U.S. stock market by a non-U.S. firm is associated with a significantly positive stock price reaction in the home market. This finding suggests that the stock market expects the cross-listing to have a positive impact on firm value. show that companies with a cross-listing in the United States have a higher valuation than non-cross-listed corporations, especially for firms with high growth opportunities domiciled in countries with relatively weak investor protection. The premium they find is larger for companies listed at official US stock exchanges (Level II and III ADR programs) than for over-the-counter listings (Level I ADR program) and private placements (Rule 144A ADR's). Cross-listing in the United States reduces the extent to which controlling shareholders can engage in expropriation (through "bonding" to the high corporate governance standards in the United States) and thereby increases the firm's ability to take advantage of growth opportunities. Recent research, shows that the listing premium for cross-listing has evaporated, due to new U.S. regulations and competition from other exchanges. Some recent academic research finds that smaller foreign firms seeking cross listing venues may be opting for UK exchanges over U.S. exchanges due to the costs imposed by the Sarbanes-Oxley Act. On the other hand, larger firms seeking "bonding" benefits from a U.S. listing continue to seek a U.S. exchange listing. There are also studies, however, who argue that cross-listings do not create long-term valuation benefits.

The academic literature largely ignores cross-listings on non-U.S. exchanges. However, there are many cross-listings on exchanges in Europe and Asia. Even U.S. firms are cross-listed in other countries. In the 1950s there was a wave of cross-listings of U.S. firms in Belgium, in the 1960s in France, in the 1970s in the U.K., and in the 1980s in Japan (see Sarkissian and Schill, 2014). Analysis of 526 cross-listings from 44 different countries on 8 major stock exchanges and document significant stock price reactions: 1.3% on average for cross-listings on US exchanges, 1.1% on London Stock Exchange, 0.6% on exchanges in continental Europe, and 0.5% on Tokyo Stock Exchange. These findings suggest that cross-listings on Anglo-Saxon exchanges create more value than on other exchanges. They also highlight the incomplete understanding of why firms cross-list outside the UK and the United States, as many of the arguments discussed above (enhanced liquidity, improved disclosure, and bonding) do not apply. In this respect, Sarkissian and Schill (2014) show that cross-listing activity in a given host country coincides with the outperformance of host and proximate home country's economies and financial markets, thus, highlighting the market timing component in cross-listing decisions.

== See also ==
- Cross border listings
