= Securities Financing Transactions Regulation =

European legislation from 2018

The Regulation (EU) 2015/2365, also known as Securities Financing Transactions Regulation (SFTR), is a body of European legislation for the regulation of securities lending and repos.

The regulation includes requirements to obtain consent from a counterparty before re-using its collateral, disclosure and reporting to trade repositories.

The objective of the legislation is to reduce systemic risk in securities lending and get more visibility over collateral re-use.

== Overview ==
The Securities Financing Transaction Regulation (SFTR) is a body of legislation for securities lending markets. SFTR was introduced by the EU to implement the FSB’s policy framework for addressing shadow banking risks in securities lending and repo and increase transparency in these markets.

The EU sought to increase the transparency of SFTs by requiring

- all SFTs, except those concluded with central banks, to be reported to central databases known as trade repositories
- information on the use of SFTs by investment funds to be disclosed to investors in the regular reports and pre-investment documents issued by the funds
- minimum transparency conditions to be met when collateral is reused, such as disclosure of the risks and the obligation to acquire prior consent

SFTR’s set of obligations were designed to take effect on a phased basis over a period of several years.

== Key aspects ==
=== Disclosure ===
Funds engaged in SFTs and total return swaps have a detailed reporting requirement on these operations, both in the regular reports of funds and in pre-investment documents.

=== Reporting ===
Any EU financial or non-financial entity will be required to report. This includes banks, brokers, funds, insurance companies, pension funds, other financing companies and non-financial companies.

The European System of Central Banks, the Bank for International Settlements and public bodies managing public debt are exempted from reporting in order not to jeopardise their discretionary policies.

To minimise the compliance burden for the industry, ESMA was asked to achieve consistency with the reporting already required under the European Markets Infrastructure Regulation (EMIR) for derivatives.

The reports shall contain the composition of the collateral used in a SFT, whether that collateral is available for re-use and has been re-used, or whether any haircuts have been applied to it.

The rules are deployed in four phases:

1. banks and broker-dealers (11 April 2020),
2. financial markets infrastructures (11 July 2020),
3. insurers and asset managers (11 October 2020) and
4. non-financial entities (11 January 2021).

To support firms’ implementation, ESMA produced draft guidelines, setting out guidance on how to fill the main field and including base scenarios.

They cover seven aspects of the reporting requirements, including the number of reportable SFTs, how to link SFT collateral with SFT loans, or how to reconcile breaks or rejections between counterparties.

=== Consent to re-use collateral ===
The Regulation seeks to improve the transparency of the reuse (any pre-default use of collateral by the collateral taker for their own purposes) of financial instruments by setting minimum conditions to be met by the parties involved, including written agreement and prior consent. Clients or counterparties have to give their consent before reuse can take place and that they make that decision based on clear information on the risks that it might entail.

== See also ==
- Selective disclosure
