= Depositary receipt =

Type of security

A depositary receipt (DR) is a negotiable financial instrument issued by a bank to represent a foreign company's publicly traded securities. The depositary receipt trades on a local stock exchange. Depositary receipts facilitates buying shares in foreign companies, because the shares do not have to leave the home country.

Depositary receipts that are listed and traded in the United States are American depositary receipts (ADRs). European banks issue European depositary receipts (EDRs), and other banks issue global depository receipts (GDRs).

== How it works ==
A depositary receipt typically requires a company to meet a stock exchange’s specific rules before listing its stock for sale. For example, a company must transfer shares to a brokerage house in its home country. Upon receipt, the brokerage uses a custodian connected to the international stock exchange for selling the depositary receipts. This connection ensures that the shares of stock actually exist and no manipulation occurs between the foreign company and the international brokerage house.

A typical ADR goes through the following steps before it is issued:

- The issuing bank in the U.S. studies the financials of the foreign company in detail to assess the strength of its stock.
- The bank buys shares of the foreign company.
- The shares are grouped into packets.
- Each packet is issued as an ADR through an American stock exchange.
- The ADR is priced in dollars, and the dividends are paid out in dollars as well, making it as simple for an American investor to buy as the stock of a U.S.-based company.

== Other forms of multi-exchange trading ==
DRs should not be confused with other methods that allow a company's stock to be traded in multiple exchanges, such as:

- Cross-listing, where a firm lists its equity shares on one or more foreign stock exchange in addition to its domestic exchange. In this case, the two stocks are technically identical and convey the same rights. To be cross-listed, a company must thus comply with the requirements of all the stock exchanges in which it is listed, such as filing.
- Dual listed companies, where two distinct companies (with separate stocks listed on different exchanges) function as one company.
- Admitted for trading, where a foreign share is accessible in a different market through an exchange convention and not actually registered within that different market.

== Types of DR ==
- American depositary receipt
- European depositary receipt
- Global Depositary Receipt
- Indian Depository Receipt

Additionally, CREST Depositary Interests (CDIs) in the United Kingdom function similarly, but not identically to depositary receipts.
