= American depositary receipt =

Security representing ownership of an underlying number of shares of a foreign company

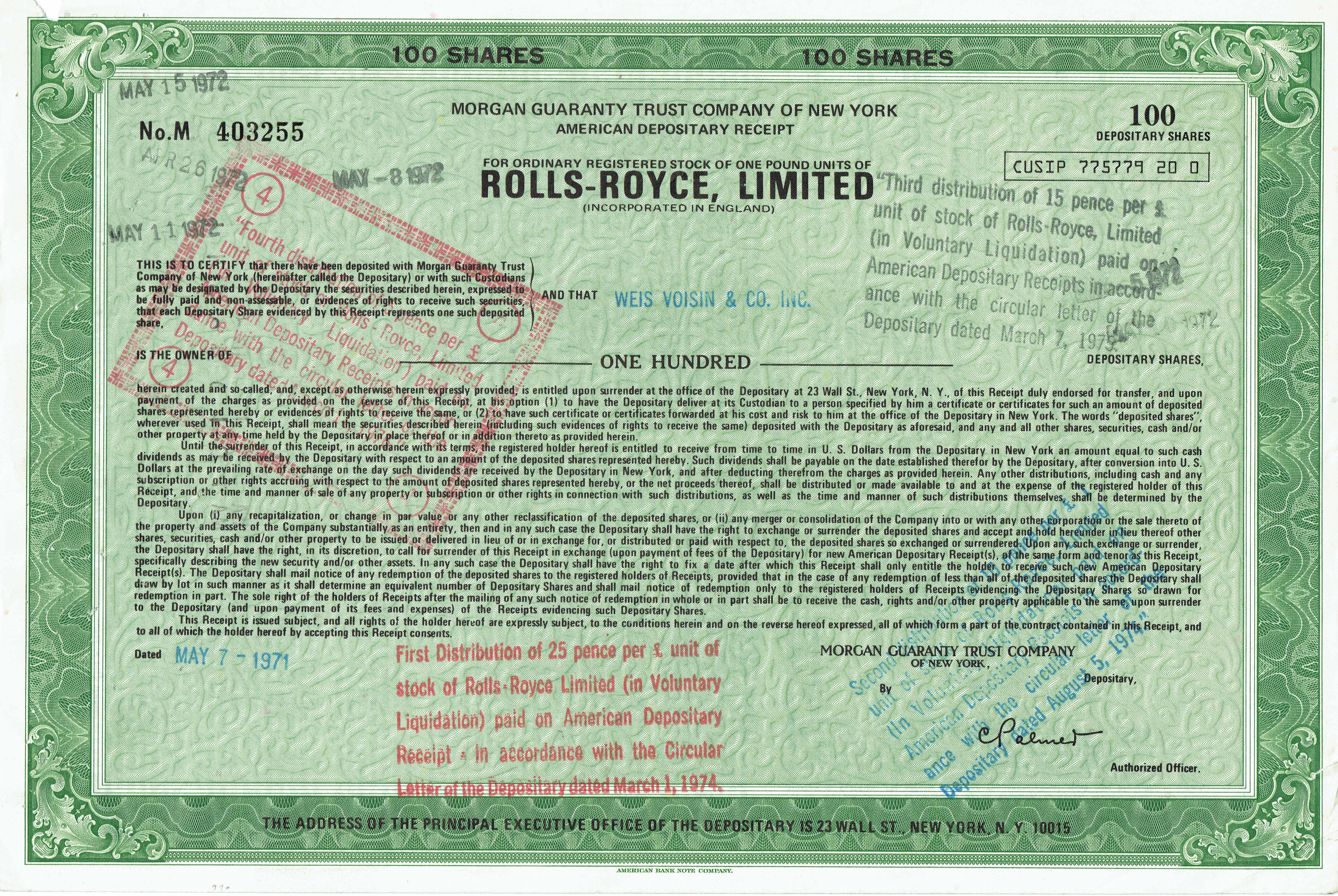
American Depositary Receipt of the British Rolls-Royce Limited, issued 7 May 1971, certificated by the Morgan Guaranty Trust Company.

An American depositary receipt (abbreviated ADR, and sometimes spelled depository) is a negotiable security that represents securities of a foreign company and allows that company's shares to trade in the U.S. financial markets.

Shares of many non-U.S. companies trade on U.S. stock exchanges through ADRs, which are denominated and pay dividends in U.S. dollars, and may be traded like regular shares of stock. ADRs are also traded during U.S. trading hours, through U.S. broker-dealers. ADRs simplify investing in foreign securities because the depositary bank "manage[s] all custody, currency and local taxes issues".

The first ADR was introduced by J.P. Morgan in 1927 for the British retailer Selfridges on the New York Curb Exchange, the American Stock Exchange's precursor.

They are the U.S. equivalent of a global depository receipt (GDR). Securities of a foreign company that are represented by an ADR are called American depositary shares (ADSs).

== Depositary receipts ==
ADRs are one type of depositary receipt (DR), which are any negotiable securities that represent securities of companies that are foreign to the market on which the DR trades. DRs enable domestic investors to buy securities of foreign companies without the accompanying risks or inconveniences of cross-border and cross-currency transactions. Companies may choose to issue depository receipts in another jurisdiction for a host of commercial reasons including signalling to their investors and clients about their enhanced corporate governance standard.

Each ADR is issued by a domestic custodian bank when the underlying shares are deposited in a foreign depositary bank, usually by a broker who has purchased the shares in the open market local to the foreign company. An ADR can represent a fraction of a share, a single share, or multiple shares of a foreign security. The holder of a DR has the right to obtain the underlying foreign security that the DR represents, but investors usually find it more convenient to own the DR. The price of a DR generally tracks the price of the foreign security in its home market, adjusted for the ratio of DRs to foreign company shares. In the case of companies domiciled in the United Kingdom, creation of ADRs attracts a 1.5% creation fee; this creation fee is different than stamp duty reserve tax charge by the UK government. Depositary banks have various responsibilities to DR holders and to the issuing foreign company the DR represents.

== ADR programs (facilities) ==
When a company establishes an ADR program, it must decide what exactly it wants out of the program, and how much time, effort, and other resources they are willing to commit. For this reason, there are different types of programs, or facilities, that a company can choose.

=== Unsponsored ADRs ===
Unsponsored shares trade on the over-the-counter (OTC) market. These shares are issued in accordance with market demand, and the foreign company has no formal agreement with a depositary bank. Unsponsored ADRs are often issued by more than one depositary bank. Each depositary services only the ADRs it has issued. Since the company is not formally involved in an unsponsored issue, the motivation of the company to list overseas is irrelevant for unsponsored programs. Instead, the dynamics of this market is determined by the incentive structure of three types of players: holders of the securities on-shore, the investors in depository receipts off-shore and the intermediaries (depository banks and exchanges).

=== Sponsored Level I ADRs ("OTC" facility) ===
Level 1 depositary receipts are the lowest level of sponsored ADRs that can be issued. When a company issues sponsored ADRs, it has one designated depositary who also acts as its transfer agent.

A majority of American depositary receipt programs currently trading are issued through a Level 1 program. This is the most convenient way for a foreign company to have its equity traded in the United States.

Level 1 shares can only be traded on the OTC market and the company has minimal reporting requirements with the U.S. Securities and Exchange Commission (SEC). The company is not required to issue quarterly or annual reports in compliance with U.S. Generally Accepted Accounting Principles (GAAP). However, the company must have a security listed on one or more stock exchanges in a foreign jurisdiction and must publish in English on its website its annual report in the form required by the laws of the country of incorporation, organization, or domicile.

Companies with shares trading under a Level 1 program may decide to upgrade their program to a Level 2 or Level 3 program for better exposure in the United States markets.

=== Sponsored Level II ADRs ("Listing" facility) ===
Level 2 depositary receipt programs are more complicated for a foreign company. When a foreign company wants to set up a Level 2 program, it must file a registration statement with the SEC and is under SEC regulation. In addition, the company is required to file a Form 20-F annually. Form 20-F is the basic equivalent of an annual report (Form 10-K) for a U.S. company. In their filings, the company is required to follow U.S. GAAP standards or the International Financial Reporting Standards (IFRS) as published by the International Accounting Standards Board (IASB).

The advantage that the company has by upgrading their program to Level 2 is that the shares can be listed on a U.S. stock exchange. These exchanges include the New York Stock Exchange (NYSE), NASDAQ, and the NYSE MKT.

While listed on these exchanges, the company must meet the exchange's listing requirements. If it fails to do so, it may be delisted and forced to downgrade its ADR program.

=== Sponsored Level III ADRs ("offering" facility) ===
A Level 3 American Depositary Receipt program is the highest level a foreign company can sponsor. Because of this distinction, the company is required to adhere to stricter rules that are similar to those followed by U.S. companies.

Setting up a Level 3 program means that the foreign company is not only taking steps to permit shares from its home market to be deposited into an ADR program and traded in the United States; it is actually issuing shares to raise capital. In accordance with this offering, the company is required to file a Form F-1, which is the format for a prospectus for the shares. They also must file a Form 20-F annually and must adhere to U.S. GAAP standards or IFRS as published by the IASB. In addition, any material information given to shareholders in the home market, must be filed with the SEC through Form 6-K.

Foreign companies with Level 3 programs will often issue materials that are more informative and are more accommodating to their U.S. shareholders because they rely on them for capital. Overall, foreign companies with a Level 3 program set up are the easiest on which to find information. Examples include Vodafone, Petrobras, and China Information Technology, Inc. (CNIT).

=== Restricted programs ===
Foreign companies that want their stock to be limited to being traded by only certain individuals may set up a restricted program. There are two SEC rules that allow this type of issuance of shares in the United States: Rule 144-A and Regulation S. ADR programs operating under one of these two rules make up approximately 30% of all issued ADRs.

==== Privately placed (SEC Rule 144A) ADRs ====
Some foreign companies will set up an ADR program under SEC Rule 144A. This provision makes the issuance of shares a private placement. Shares of companies registered under Rule 144-A are restricted stock and may only be issued to or traded by qualified institutional buyers (QIBs).

U.S. public shareholders are generally not permitted to invest in these ADR programs, and most are held exclusively through the Depository Trust & Clearing Corporation, so there is often very little information on these companies.

Characteristics include:

- It is a secured security.
- A fixed rate of interest is paid.
- Can be converted into multiple shares.

==== Offshore (SEC Regulation S) ADRs ====
The other way to restrict the trading of depositary shares to U.S. public investors is to issue them under the terms of SEC Regulation S. This regulation means that the shares are not, and will not be registered with any U.S. securities regulation authority.

Regulation S shares cannot be held or traded by any "U.S. person" as defined by SEC Regulation S rules. The shares are registered and issued to offshore, non-U.S. residents.

Regulation S ADRs can be merged into a Level 1 program after the restriction period has expired, and the foreign issuer elects to do this.

== Sourcing ADRs ==
One can either source new ADRs by depositing the corresponding domestic shares of the company with the depositary bank that administers the ADR program or, instead, one can obtain existing ADRs in the secondary market. The latter can be achieved either by purchasing the ADRs on a U.S. stock exchange or via purchasing the underlying domestic shares of the company on their primary exchange and then swapping them for ADRs; these swaps are called "crossbook swaps" and on many occasions account for the bulk of ADR secondary trading. This is especially true in the case of trading in ADRs of UK companies where creation of new ADRs attracts a 1.5% stamp duty reserve tax (SDRT) charge by the UK government; sourcing existing ADRs in the secondary market (either via crossbook swaps or on exchange) instead is not subject to SDRT.

== ADR termination ==
Most ADR programs are subject to possible termination. Termination of the ADR agreement will result in cancellation of all the depositary receipts, and a subsequent delisting from all exchanges where they trade. The termination can be at the discretion of the foreign issuer or the depositary bank, but is typically at the request of the issuer. There may be a number of reasons why ADRs terminate, but in most cases the foreign issuer is undergoing some type of reorganization or merger.

Owners of ADRs are typically notified in writing at least thirty days prior to a termination. Once notified, an owner can surrender their ADRs and take delivery of the foreign securities represented by the Receipt, or do nothing. If an ADR holder elects to take possession of the underlying foreign shares, there is no guarantee the shares will trade on any U.S. exchange. The holder of the foreign shares would have to find a broker who has trading authority in the foreign market where those shares trade. If the owner continues to hold the ADR past the effective date of termination, the depositary bank will continue to hold the foreign deposited securities and collect dividends, but will cease distributions to ADR owners.

Usually up to one year after the effective date of the termination, the depositary bank will liquidate and allocate the proceeds to those respective clients. Many US brokerages can continue to hold foreign stock, but may lack the ability to trade it overseas.

== Example ==
In 2013 a China-based company composed of various offshore holding companies called Autohome (ATHM) offered 7,820,000 American depositary shares (ADSs) representing its 7,820,000 Class A Ordinary Shares from its initial public offering. Details can be found from its prospectus dated December 16, 2013, under Registration No. 333-192085 filed pursuant to Rule 424(b)(4) of the U.S. Securities Exchange Act of 1933.

== See also ==
- Cross listing
- Depositary receipt
- Form F-6
- Foreign currency convertible bonds
- Indian Depository Receipt
