= Credit default swap =

Financial swap agreement in case of default

If the reference bond performs without default, the protection buyer pays quarterly payments to the seller until maturity

If the reference bond defaults, the protection seller pays par value of the bond to the buyer, and the buyer transfers ownership of the bond to the seller

A credit default swap (CDS) is a financial contract that transfers the risk of a borrower failing to repay a debt. The CDS is a type of credit derivative. The buyer makes regular payments to the seller, and in return the seller agrees to pay the buyer if a borrower fails to repay a debt or another agreed credit event occurs. The borrower, called the reference entity, is usually a company or government and is not a party to the contract.

Credit events include failure to pay and bankruptcy. After one, the seller either pays the buyer the face value of the debt in exchange for the defaulted bond (physical settlement), or pays the difference between face value and the bond's market value (cash settlement). When many contracts refer to the same borrower, an auction is often held to set one settlement price.

A CDS resembles insurance, but the buyer does not need to own the debt or suffer a loss, and CDSs are not subject to insurance regulation. Banks and investors use them to hedge credit risk. Others use them to speculate on a borrower's creditworthiness or to make arbitrage trades. A CDS bought by someone who does not own the debt is called a "naked" CDS, and these are thought to make up most of the market. Most contracts follow standard forms published by the International Swaps and Derivatives Association (ISDA).

CDSs have existed since the early 1990s, and JPMorgan Chase is widely credited with creating the modern form in 1994. US law largely exempted CDSs from regulation in 2000. By 2002, speculators rather than banks hedging loans dominated the market. The market grew quickly reaching a notional value of $62.2 trillion at the end of 2007. In the 2008 financial crisis, the lack of transparency in this market raised concerns about systemic risk, and AIG, a large seller of protection, needed an $85 billion US government loan. After 2008, central clearing was introduced and the market shrank as offsetting contracts were cancelled falling to about $8 trillion by mid-2018.

Critics say CDSs encourage speculation and magnify risk. Supporters say they spread risk and add liquidity to the market.

== Overview ==
Credit default swaps in their current form have existed since the early 1990s and increased in use in the early 2000s. By the end of 2007, the outstanding CDS amount was $62.2 trillion, falling to $26.3 trillion by mid-year 2010 and reportedly $25.5 trillion in early 2012.

As of 2009, CDSs were not traded on an exchange and there was no required reporting of transactions to a government agency.

During the 2008 financial crisis, the lack of transparency in this large market became a concern to regulators as it could pose a systemic risk. In March 2010, the Depository Trust & Clearing Corporation (see Sources of Market Data) announced it would give regulators greater access to its credit default swaps database. There was "$8 trillion notional value outstanding" as of June 2018.

== Description ==
Buyer purchased a CDS at time t_{0} and makes regular premium payments at times t_{1}, t_{2}, t_{3}, and t_{4}. If the associated credit instrument suffers no credit event, then the buyer continues paying premiums at t_{5}, t_{6} and so on until the end of the contract at time t_{n}.

However, if the associated credit instrument suffered a credit event at t_{5}, then the seller pays the buyer for the loss, and the buyer would cease paying premiums to the seller.

A "credit default swap" (CDS) is a credit derivative contract between two counterparties. The buyer makes periodic payments to the seller, and in return receives a payoff if an underlying financial instrument defaults or experiences a similar credit event.

The CDS may refer to a specified loan or bond obligation of a "reference entity", usually a corporation or government. The reference entity is not a party to the contract. The buyer makes regular premium payments to the seller, the premium amounts constituting the "spread" charged in basis points by the seller to insure against a credit event. If the reference entity defaults, the protection seller pays the buyer the par value of the bond in exchange for physical delivery of the bond, although settlement may also be by cash or auction.

A default is often referred to as a "credit event" and includes such events as failure to pay, restructuring and bankruptcy, or even a drop in the borrower's credit rating. CDS contracts on sovereign obligations also usually include as credit events repudiation, moratorium, and acceleration. Most CDSs are in the $10–$20 million range with maturities between one and 10 years. Five years is the most typical maturity.

An investor or speculator may "buy protection" to hedge the risk of default on a bond or other debt instrument, regardless of whether such investor or speculator holds an interest in or bears any risk of loss relating to such bond or debt instrument. In this way, a CDS is similar to credit insurance, although CDSs are not subject to regulations governing traditional insurance. Also, investors can buy and sell protection without owning debt of the reference entity. These "naked credit default swaps" allow traders to speculate on the creditworthiness of reference entities. CDSs can be used to create synthetic long and short positions in the reference entity. Naked CDS constitute most of the market in CDS. In addition, CDSs can also be used in capital structure arbitrage.

As an example, imagine that an investor buys a CDS from AAA-Bank, where the reference entity is Risky Corp. The investor—the buyer of protection—will make regular payments to AAA-Bank—the seller of protection. If Risky Corp defaults on its debt, the investor receives a one-time payment from AAA-Bank, and the CDS contract is terminated.

If the investor owns Risky Corp's debt (i.e., is owed money by Risky Corp), a CDS can act as a hedge. But investors can also buy CDS contracts referencing Risky Corp debt without actually owning any Risky Corp debt. This may be done for speculative purposes, to bet against the solvency of Risky Corp in a gamble to make money, or to hedge investments in other companies whose fortunes are expected to be similar to those of Risky Corp (see Uses).

If the reference entity (i.e., Risky Corp) defaults, one of two kinds of settlement can occur:

- the investor delivers a defaulted asset to Bank for payment of the par value, which is known as physical settlement;
- AAA-Bank pays the investor the difference between the par value and the market price of a specified debt obligation (even if Risky Corp defaults there is usually some recovery, i.e., not all the investor's money is lost), which is known as cash settlement.

The "spread" of a CDS is the annual amount the protection buyer must pay the protection seller over the length of the contract, expressed as a percentage of the notional amount. For example, if the CDS spread of Risky Corp is 50 basis points, or 0.5% (1 basis point = 0.01%), then an investor buying $10 million worth of protection from AAA-Bank must pay the bank $50,000. Payments are usually made on a quarterly basis, in arrear. These payments continue until either the CDS contract expires or Risky Corp defaults.

All things being equal, at any given time, if the maturity of two credit default swaps is the same, then the CDS associated with a company with a higher CDS spread is considered more likely to default by the market, since a higher fee is being charged to protect against this happening. However, factors such as liquidity and estimated loss given default can affect the comparison. Credit spread rates and credit ratings of the underlying or reference obligations are considered among money managers to be the best indicators of the likelihood of sellers of CDSs having to perform under these contracts.

=== Differences from insurance ===
CDS contracts have obvious similarities with insurance contracts because the buyer pays a premium and, in return, receives a sum of money if an adverse event occurs.

However, there are also many differences, the most important being that an insurance contract provides an indemnity against the losses actually suffered by the policy holder on an asset in which it holds an insurable interest. By contrast, a CDS provides an equal payout to all holders, calculated using an agreed, market-wide method. The holder does not need to own the underlying security and does not even have to suffer a loss from the default event. The CDS can therefore be used to speculate on debt objects.

The other differences include:

- The seller might in principle not be a regulated entity (though in practice most are banks);
- The seller is not required to maintain reserves to cover the protection sold (this was a principal cause of AIG's financial distress in 2008; it had insufficient reserves to meet the "run" of expected payouts caused by the collapse of the housing bubble);
- Insurance requires the buyer to disclose all known risks, while CDSs do not (the CDS seller can in many cases still determine potential risk, as the debt instrument being "insured" is a market commodity available for inspection, but in the case of certain instruments like CDOs made up of "slices" of debt packages, it can be difficult to tell exactly what is being insured);
- Insurers manage risk primarily by setting loss reserves based on the Law of large numbers and actuarial analysis. Dealers in CDSs manage risk primarily through hedging with other CDS deals and in the underlying bond markets;
- CDS contracts are generally subject to mark-to-market accounting, introducing income statement and balance sheet volatility while insurance contracts are not;
- Hedge accounting may not be available under US Generally Accepted Accounting Principles (GAAP) unless the requirements of FAS 133 are met. In practice this rarely happens;
- To cancel the insurance contract, the buyer can typically stop paying premiums, while for CDS the contract needs to be unwound.

=== Risk ===
When entering into a CDS, both the buyer and seller of credit protection take on counterparty risk:

- The buyer takes the risk that the seller may default. If AAA-Bank and Risky Corp. default simultaneously ("double default"), the buyer loses its protection against default by the reference entity. If AAA-Bank defaults but Risky Corp. does not, the buyer might need to replace the defaulted CDS at a higher cost.
- The seller takes the risk that the buyer may default on the contract, depriving the seller of the expected revenue stream. More importantly, a seller normally limits its risk by buying offsetting protection from another party — that is, it hedges its exposure. If the original buyer drops out, the seller squares its position by either unwinding the hedge transaction or by selling a new CDS to a third party. Depending on market conditions, that may be at a lower price than the original CDS and may therefore involve a loss to the seller.

In the future, in the event that regulatory reforms require that CDS be traded and settled via a central exchange/clearing house, such as ICE TCC, there will no longer be "counterparty risk", as the risk of the counterparty will be held with the central exchange/clearing house.

As is true with other forms of over-the-counter derivatives, CDS might involve liquidity risk. If one or both parties to a CDS contract must post collateral (which is common), there can be margin calls requiring the posting of additional collateral. The required collateral is agreed on by the parties when the CDS is first issued. This margin amount may vary over the life of the CDS contract, if the market price of the CDS contract changes, or the credit rating of one of the parties changes. Many CDS contracts even require payment of an upfront fee (composed of "reset to par" and an "initial coupon.").

Another kind of risk for the seller of credit default swaps is jump risk or jump-to-default risk ("JTD risk"). A seller of a CDS could be collecting monthly premiums with little expectation that the reference entity may default. A default creates a sudden obligation on the protection sellers to pay millions, if not billions, of dollars to protection buyers. This risk is not present in other over-the-counter derivatives.

=== Sources of market data ===
Data about the credit default swaps market is available from three main sources. Data on an annual and semiannual basis is available from the International Swaps and Derivatives Association (ISDA) since 2001 and from the Bank for International Settlements (BIS) since 2004. The Depository Trust & Clearing Corporation (DTCC), through its global repository Trade Information Warehouse (TIW), provides weekly data but publicly available information goes back only one year. The numbers provided by each source do not always match because each provider uses different sampling methods. Daily, intraday and real time data is available from S&P Capital IQ through their acquisition of Credit Market Analysis in 2012.

According to DTCC, the Trade Information Warehouse maintains the only "global electronic database for virtually all CDS contracts outstanding in the marketplace."

The Office of the Comptroller of the Currency publishes quarterly credit derivative data about insured U.S commercial banks and trust companies.

== Uses ==
Credit default swaps can be used by investors for speculation, hedging and arbitrage.

=== Speculation ===
Credit default swaps allow investors to speculate on changes in CDS spreads of single names or of market indices such as the North American CDX index or the European iTraxx index. An investor might believe that an entity's CDS spreads are too high or too low, relative to the entity's bond yields, and attempt to profit from that view by entering into a trade, known as a basis trade, that combines a CDS with a cash bond and an interest rate swap.

Finally, an investor might speculate on an entity's credit quality, since generally CDS spreads increase as credit-worthiness declines, and decline as credit-worthiness increases. The investor might therefore buy CDS protection on a company to speculate that it is about to default. Alternatively, the investor might sell protection if it thinks that the company's creditworthiness might improve. The investor selling the CDS is viewed as being "long" on the CDS and the credit, as if the investor owned the bond. In contrast, the investor who bought protection is "short" on the CDS and the underlying credit.

Credit default swaps opened up important new avenues to speculators. Investors could go long on a bond without any upfront cost of buying a bond; all the investor need do was promise to pay in the event of default. Shorting a bond faced difficult practical problems, such that shorting was often not feasible; CDS made shorting credit possible and popular. Because the speculator in either case does not own the bond, its position is said to be a synthetic long or short position.

For example, a hedge fund believes that Risky Corp will soon default on its debt. Therefore, it buys $10 million worth of CDS protection for two years from AAA-Bank, with Risky Corp as the reference entity, at a spread of 500 basis points (=5%) per annum.

- If Risky Corp does indeed default after, say, one year, then the hedge fund will have paid $500,000 to AAA-Bank, but then receives $10 million (assuming zero recovery rate, and that AAA-Bank has the liquidity to cover the loss), thereby making a profit. AAA-Bank, and its investors, will incur a $9.5 million loss minus recovery unless the bank has somehow offset the position before the default.
- However, if Risky Corp does not default, then the CDS contract runs for two years, and the hedge fund ends up paying $1 million, without any return, thereby making a loss. AAA-Bank, by selling protection, has made $1 million without any upfront investment.

Note that there is a third possibility in the above scenario; the hedge fund could decide to liquidate its position after a certain period of time in an attempt to realise its gains or losses. For example:

- After 1 year, the market now considers Risky Corp more likely to default, so its CDS spread has widened from 500 to 1500 basis points. The hedge fund may choose to sell $10 million worth of protection for 1 year to AAA-Bank at this higher rate. Therefore, over the two years the hedge fund pays the bank 2 * 5% * $10 million = $1 million, but receives 1 * 15% * $10 million = $1.5 million, giving a total profit of $500,000.
- In another scenario, after one year the market now considers Risky much less likely to default, so its CDS spread has tightened from 500 to 250 basis points. Again, the hedge fund may choose to sell $10 million worth of protection for 1 year to AAA-Bank at this lower spread. Therefore, over the two years the hedge fund pays the bank 2 * 5% * $10 million = $1 million, but receives 1 * 2.5% * $10 million = $250,000, giving a total loss of $750,000. This loss is smaller than the $1 million loss that would have occurred if the second transaction had not been entered into.

Transactions such as these do not even have to be entered into over the long-term. If Risky Corp's CDS spread had widened by just a couple of basis points over the course of one day, the hedge fund could have entered into an offsetting contract immediately and made a small profit over the life of the two CDS contracts.

Credit default swaps are also used to structure synthetic collateralized debt obligations (CDOs). Instead of owning bonds or loans, a synthetic CDO gets credit exposure to a portfolio of fixed income assets without owning those assets through the use of CDS. CDOs are viewed as complex and opaque financial instruments. An example of a synthetic CDO is Abacus 2007-AC1, which is the subject of the civil suit for fraud brought by the SEC against Goldman Sachs in April 2010. Abacus is a synthetic CDO consisting of credit default swaps referencing a variety of mortgage-backed securities.

==== Naked credit default swaps ====
In the examples above, the hedge fund did not own any debt of Risky Corp. A CDS in which the buyer does not own the underlying debt is referred to as a naked credit default swap, estimated to be up to 80% of the credit default swap market. There is currently a debate in the United States and Europe about whether speculative uses of credit default swaps should be banned. Legislation is under consideration by Congress as part of financial reform.

Critics assert that naked CDSs should be banned, comparing them to buying fire insurance on your neighbor's house, which creates a huge incentive for arson. Analogizing to the concept of insurable interest, critics say you should not be able to buy a CDS—insurance against default—when you do not own the bond. Short selling is also viewed as gambling and the CDS market as a casino. Another concern is the size of the CDS market. Because naked credit default swaps are synthetic, there is no limit to how many can be sold. The gross amount of CDSs far exceeds all "real" corporate bonds and loans outstanding. As a result, the risk of default is magnified leading to concerns about systemic risk.

Financier George Soros called for an outright ban on naked credit default swaps, viewing them as "toxic" and allowing speculators to bet against and "bear raid" companies or countries. His concerns were echoed by several European politicians who, during the Greek government-debt crisis, accused naked CDS buyers of making the crisis worse.

Despite these concerns, former United States Secretary of the Treasury Geithner and Commodity Futures Trading Commission Chairman Gensler are not in favor of an outright ban on naked credit default swaps. They prefer greater transparency and better capitalization requirements. These officials think that naked CDSs have a place in the market.

Proponents of naked credit default swaps say that short selling in various forms, whether credit default swaps, options or futures, has the beneficial effect of increasing liquidity in the marketplace. That benefits hedging activities. Without speculators buying and selling naked CDSs, banks wanting to hedge might not find a ready seller of protection. Speculators also create a more competitive marketplace, keeping prices down for hedgers. A robust market in credit default swaps can also serve as a barometer to regulators and investors about the credit health of a company or country.

Germany's market regulator BaFin found that naked CDS did not worsen the Greek credit crisis. Without credit default swaps, Greece's borrowing costs would be higher. As of November 2011, the Greek bonds have a bond yield of 28%.

A bill in the U.S. Congress proposed giving a public authority the power to limit the use of CDSs other than for hedging purposes, but the bill did not become law.

=== Hedging ===
Credit default swaps are often used to manage the risk of default that arises from holding debt. A bank, for example, may hedge its risk that a borrower may default on a loan by entering into a CDS contract as the buyer of protection. If the loan goes into default, the proceeds from the CDS contract cancel out the losses on the underlying debt.

There are other ways to eliminate or reduce the risk of default. The bank could sell (that is, assign) the loan outright or bring in other banks as participants. However, these options may not meet the bank's needs. Consent of the corporate borrower is often required. The bank may not want to incur the time and cost to find loan participants.

If both the borrower and lender are well-known and the market (or even worse, the news media) learns that the bank is selling the loan, then the sale may be viewed as signaling a lack of trust in the borrower, which could severely damage the banker-client relationship. In addition, the bank simply may not want to sell or share the potential profits from the loan. By buying a credit default swap, the bank can lay off default risk while still keeping the loan in its portfolio. The downside to this hedge is that without default risk, a bank may have no motivation to actively monitor the loan and the counterparty has no relationship to the borrower.

Another kind of hedge is against concentration risk. A bank's risk management team may advise that the bank is overly concentrated with a particular borrower or industry. The bank can lay off some of this risk by buying a CDS. Because the borrower—the reference entity—is not a party to a credit default swap, entering into a CDS allows the bank to achieve its diversity objectives without impacting its loan portfolio or customer relations. Similarly, a bank selling a CDS can diversify its portfolio by gaining exposure to an industry in which the selling bank has no customer base.

A bank buying protection can also use a CDS to free regulatory capital. By offloading a particular credit risk, a bank is not required to hold as much capital in reserve against the risk of default (traditionally 8% of the total loan under Basel I). This frees resources the bank can use to make other loans to the same key customer or to other borrowers.

Hedging risk is not limited to banks as lenders. Holders of corporate bonds, such as banks, pension funds or insurance companies, may buy a CDS as a hedge for similar reasons. Pension fund example: A pension fund owns five-year bonds issued by Risky Corp with par value of $10 million. To manage the risk of losing money if Risky Corp defaults on its debt, the pension fund buys a CDS from Derivative Bank in a notional amount of $10 million. The CDS trades at 200 basis points (200 basis points = 2.00 percent). In return for this credit protection, the pension fund pays 2% of $10 million ($200,000) per annum in quarterly installments of $50,000 to Derivative Bank.

- If Risky Corporation does not default on its bond payments, the pension fund makes quarterly payments to Derivative Bank for 5 years and receives its $10 million back after five years from Risky Corp. Though the protection payments totaling $1 million reduce investment returns for the pension fund, its risk of loss due to Risky Corp defaulting on the bond is eliminated.
- If Risky Corporation defaults on its debt three years into the CDS contract, the pension fund would stop paying the quarterly premium, and Derivative Bank would ensure that the pension fund is refunded for its loss of $10 million minus recovery (either by physical or cash settlement — see Settlement below). The pension fund still loses the $600,000 it has paid over three years, but without the CDS contract it would have lost the entire $10 million minus recovery.

In addition to financial institutions, large suppliers can use a credit default swap on a public bond issue or a basket of similar risks as a proxy for its own credit risk exposure on receivables.

Although credit default swaps have been highly criticized for their role in the 2008 financial crisis, most observers conclude that using credit default swaps as a hedging device has a useful purpose.

=== Arbitrage ===
Capital Structure Arbitrage is an example of an arbitrage strategy that uses CDS transactions. This technique relies on the fact that a company's stock price and its CDS spread should exhibit negative correlation; i.e., if the outlook for a company improves then its share price should go up and its CDS spread should tighten, since it is less likely to default on its debt. However, if its outlook worsens then its CDS spread should widen and its stock price should fall.

Techniques reliant on this are known as capital structure arbitrage because they exploit market inefficiencies between different parts of the same company's capital structure; i.e., mis-pricings between a company's debt and equity. An arbitrageur attempts to exploit the spread between a company's CDS and its equity in certain situations.

For example, if a company has announced some bad news and its share price has dropped by 25%, but its CDS spread has remained unchanged, then an investor might expect the CDS spread to increase relative to the share price. Therefore, a basic strategy would be to go long on the CDS spread (by buying CDS protection) while simultaneously hedging oneself by buying the underlying stock. This technique would benefit in the event of the CDS spread widening relative to the equity price, but would lose money if the company's CDS spread tightened relative to its equity.

An interesting situation in which the inverse correlation between a company's stock price and CDS spread breaks down is during a Leveraged buyout (LBO). Frequently this leads to the company's CDS spread widening due to the extra debt that will soon be put on the company's books, but also an increase in its share price, since buyers of a company usually end up paying a premium.

Another common arbitrage strategy aims to exploit the fact that the swap-adjusted spread of a CDS should trade closely with that of the underlying cash bond issued by the reference entity. Misalignment in spreads may occur due to technical reasons such as:

- Specific settlement differences
- Shortages in a particular underlying instrument
- The cost of funding a position
- Existence of buyers constrained from buying exotic derivatives.

The difference between CDS spreads and asset swap spreads is called the basis and should theoretically be close to zero. Basis trades attempt to exploit this difference to make a profit, however hedging a bond with a CDS does have irreducible risks which should be considered when making basis trades.

== History ==
=== Conception ===
Forms of credit default swaps had been in existence from at least the early 1990s, with early trades carried out by Bankers Trust in 1991. J.P. Morgan & Co. and economist Blythe Masters are widely credited with creating the modern credit default swap in 1994. In that instance, J.P. Morgan had extended a $4.8 billion credit line to Exxon, which faced the threat of $5 billion in punitive damages for the Exxon Valdez oil spill. A team of J.P. Morgan bankers led by Masters then sold the credit risk from the credit line to the European Bank of Reconstruction and Development in order to cut the reserves that J.P. Morgan was required to hold against Exxon's default, thus improving its own balance sheet.

Despite early successes, credit default swaps could not be profitable until an industrialized and streamlined process was created to issue them. This changed when CDS's began to be traded as securities from JPMorgan, an effort led by Bill Demchak where he and his team created bundles of swaps and sold them to investors. The investors would get the streams of revenue, according to the risk-and-reward level they chose; the bank would get insurance against its loans, and fees for setting up the deal.

In 1997, JPMorgan developed a proprietary product called BISTRO (Broad Index Securitized Trust Offering) that used CDS to clean up a bank's balance sheet. The advantage of BISTRO was that it used securitization to split up the credit risk into little pieces that smaller investors found more digestible, since most investors lacked EBRD's capability to accept $4.8 billion in credit risk all at once. BISTRO was the first example of what later became known as synthetic collateralized debt obligations (CDOs). There were two Bistros in 1997 for approximately $10 billion (~$18.6 billion in 2025) each.

Mindful of the concentration of default risk as one of the causes of the S&L crisis, regulators initially found CDS's ability to disperse default risk attractive. In 2000, credit default swaps became largely exempt from regulation by both the U.S. Securities and Exchange Commission (SEC) and the Commodity Futures Trading Commission (CFTC). The Commodity Futures Modernization Act of 2000, which was also responsible for the Enron loophole, specifically stated that CDSs are neither futures nor securities and so are outside the remit of the SEC and CFTC.

=== Market growth ===
At first, banks were the dominant players in the market, as CDS were primarily used to hedge risk in connection with their lending activities. Banks also saw an opportunity to free up regulatory capital. By March 1998, the global market for CDS was estimated at $300 billion, with JP Morgan alone accounting for about $50 billion of this.

The high market share enjoyed by the banks was soon eroded as more and more asset managers and hedge funds saw trading opportunities in credit default swaps. By 2002, investors as speculators, rather than banks as hedgers, dominated the market. National banks in the USA used credit default swaps as early as 1996. In that year, the Office of the Comptroller of the Currency measured the size of the market as tens of billions of dollars. Six years later, by year-end 2002, the outstanding amount was over $2 trillion (~$3.42 trillion in 2025).

Although speculators fueled the exponential growth, other factors also played a part. An extended market could not emerge until 1999, when ISDA standardized the documentation for credit default swaps. Also, the 1997 Asian financial crisis spurred a market for CDS in emerging market sovereign debt. In addition, in 2004, index trading began on a large scale and grew rapidly.

The market size for Credit Default Swaps more than doubled in size each year from $3.7 trillion in 2003. By the end of 2007, the CDS market had a notional value of $62.2 trillion. But notional amount fell during 2008 as a result of dealer "portfolio compression" efforts (replacing offsetting redundant contracts), and by the end of 2008 notional amount outstanding had fallen 38 percent to $38.6 trillion.

Explosive growth was not without operational headaches. On September 15, 2005, the New York Fed summoned 14 banks to its offices. Billions of dollars of CDS were traded daily but the record keeping was more than two weeks behind. This created severe risk management issues, as counterparties were in legal and financial limbo. U.K. authorities expressed the same concerns.

=== Market as of 2008 ===
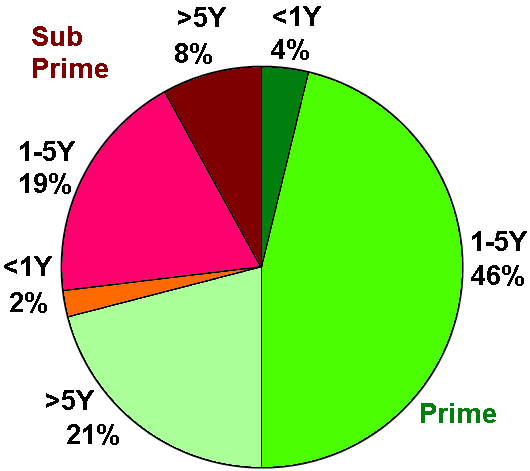
Composition of the United States 15.5 trillion US dollar CDS market at the end of 2008 Q2. Green tints show Prime asset CDSs, reddish tints show sub-prime asset CDSs. Numbers followed by "Y" indicate years until maturity.

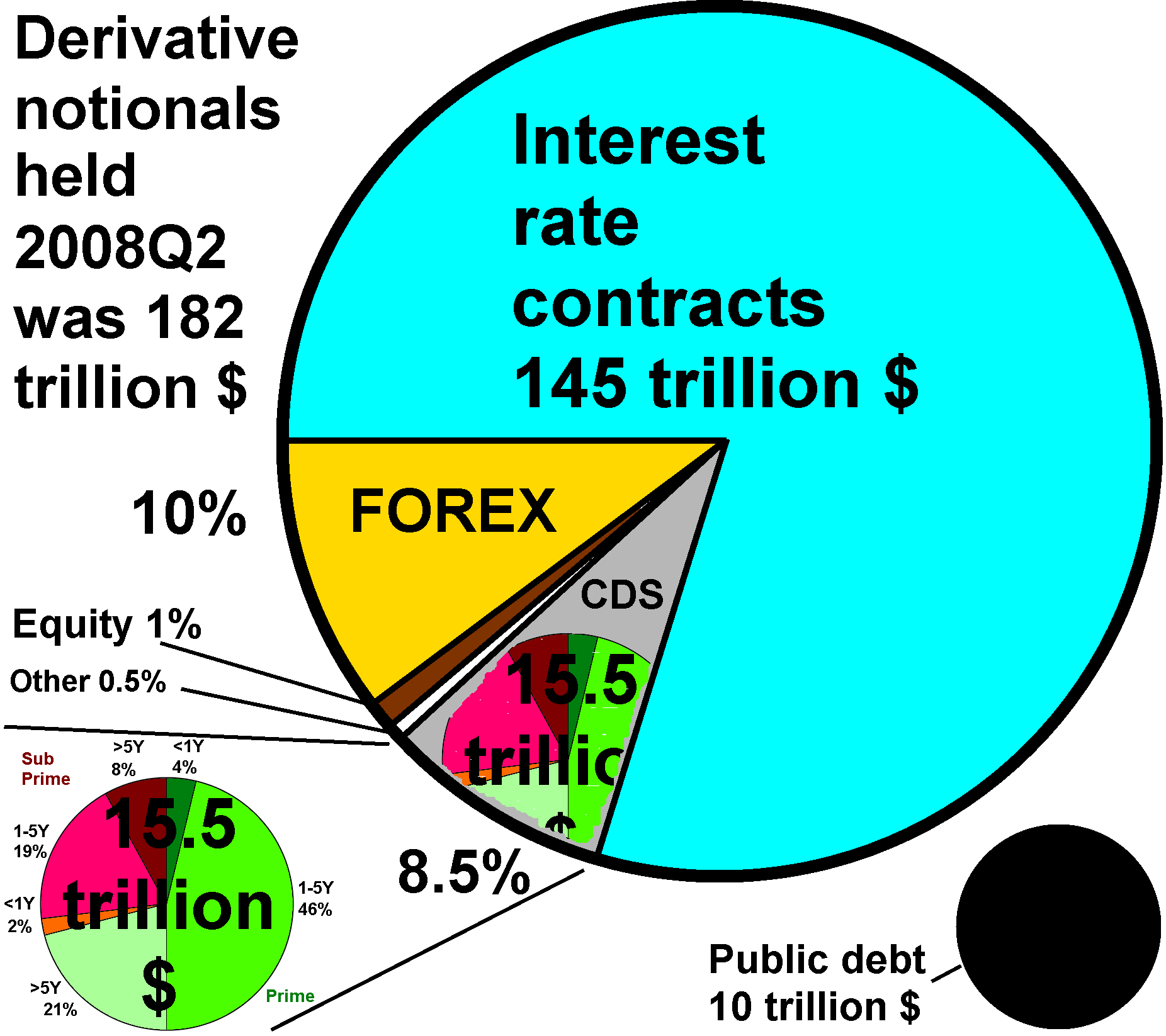
Proportion of CDSs nominals (lower left) held by United States banks compared to all derivatives, in 2008Q2. The black disc represents the 2008 public debt.

Since default is a relatively rare occurrence (historically around 0.2% of investment grade companies default in any one year), in most CDS contracts the only payments are the premium payments from buyer to seller. Thus, although the above figures for outstanding notionals are very large, in the absence of default the net cash flows are only a small fraction of this total: for a 100 bp = 1% spread, the annual cash flows are only 1% of the notional amount.

==== Regulatory concerns ====
The market for credit default swaps attracted considerable concern from regulators after a number of large scale incidents in 2008, starting with the collapse of Bear Stearns.

In the days and weeks leading up to Bear's collapse, the bank's CDS spread widened dramatically, indicating a surge of buyers taking out protection on the bank. It has been suggested that this widening was responsible for the perception that Bear Stearns was vulnerable, and therefore restricted its access to wholesale capital, which eventually led to its forced sale to JP Morgan in March. An alternative view is that this surge in CDS protection buyers was a symptom rather than a cause of Bear's collapse; i.e., investors saw that Bear was in trouble, and sought to hedge any naked exposure to the bank, or speculate on its collapse.

In September, the bankruptcy of Lehman Brothers caused a total close to $400 billion to become payable to the buyers of CDS protection referenced against the insolvent bank. However the net amount that changed hands was around $7.2 billion. This difference is due to the process of 'netting'. Market participants co-operated so that CDS sellers were allowed to deduct from their payouts the inbound funds due to them from their hedging positions. Dealers generally attempt to remain risk-neutral, so that their losses and gains after big events offset each other.

Also in September American International Group (AIG) required an $85 billion federal loan because it had been excessively selling CDS protection without hedging against the possibility that the reference entities might decline in value, which exposed the insurance giant to potential losses over $100 billion. The CDS on Lehman were settled smoothly, as was largely the case for the other 11 credit events occurring in 2008 that triggered payouts. And while it is arguable that other incidents would have been as bad or worse if less efficient instruments than CDS had been used for speculation and insurance purposes, the closing months of 2008 saw regulators working hard to reduce the risk involved in CDS transactions.

In 2008 there was no centralized exchange or clearing house for CDS transactions; they were all done over the counter (OTC). This led to recent calls for the market to open up in terms of transparency and regulation.

In November 2008 the Depository Trust & Clearing Corporation (DTCC), which runs a warehouse for CDS trade confirmations accounting for around 90% of the total market, announced that it will release market data on the outstanding notional of CDS trades on a weekly basis. The data can be accessed on the DTCC's website here:

By 2010, Intercontinental Exchange, through its subsidiaries, ICE Trust in New York, launched in 2008, and ICE Clear Europe Limited in London, UK, launched in July 2009, clearing entities for credit default swaps (CDS) had cleared more than $10 trillion in credit default swaps (CDS) (Terhune Bloomberg Business Week 2010-07-29). (Note: Intercontinental Exchange's closest rival as credit default swaps (CDS) clearing houses, CME Group (CME) cleared $192 million in comparison to ICE's $10 trillion (Terhune Bloomberg Business Week 2010-07-29).) Bloomberg's Terhune (2010) explained how investors seeking high-margin returns use credit default swaps to bet against financial instruments owned by other companies and countries. Intercontinental's clearing houses guarantee every transaction between buyer and seller providing a much-needed safety net reducing the impact of a default by spreading the risk. ICE collects on every trade.(Terhune Bloomberg Business Week 2010-07-29). Brookings senior research fellow, Robert E. Litan, cautioned however, "valuable pricing data will not be fully reported, leaving ICE's institutional partners with a huge informational advantage over other traders. He calls ICE Trust "a derivatives dealers' club" in which members make money at the expense of nonmembers (Terhune citing Litan in Bloomberg Business Week 2010-07-29). (Litan Derivatives Dealers’ Club 2010)." Actually, Litan conceded that "some limited progress toward central clearing of CDS has been made in recent months, with CDS contracts between dealers now being cleared centrally primarily through one clearinghouse (ICE Trust) in which the dealers have a significant financial interest (Litan 2010:6)." However, "as long as ICE Trust has a monopoly in clearing, watch for the dealers to limit the expansion of the products that are centrally cleared, and to create barriers to electronic trading and smaller dealers making competitive markets in cleared products (Litan 2010:8)."

In 2009 the U.S. Securities and Exchange Commission granted an exemption for Intercontinental Exchange to begin guaranteeing credit-default swaps. The SEC exemption represented the last regulatory approval needed by Atlanta-based Intercontinental. A derivatives analyst at Morgan Stanley, one of the backers for IntercontinentalExchange's subsidiary, ICE Trust in New York, launched in 2008, claimed that the "clearinghouse, and changes to the contracts to standardize them, will probably boost activity". IntercontinentalExchange's subsidiary, ICE Trust's larger competitor, CME Group Inc., hasn't received an SEC exemption, and agency spokesman John Nester said he didn't know when a decision would be made.

=== Market as of 2009 ===
The early months of 2009 saw several fundamental changes to the way CDSs operate, resulting from concerns over the instruments' safety after the events of the previous year. According to Deutsche Bank managing director Athanassios Diplas "the industry pushed through 10 years worth of changes in just a few months". By late 2008 processes had been introduced allowing CDSs that offset each other to be cancelled. Along with termination of contracts that have recently paid out such as those based on Lehmans, this had by March reduced the face value of the market down to an estimated $30 trillion.

The Bank for International Settlements estimates that outstanding derivatives total $708 trillion. U.S. and European regulators are developing separate plans to stabilize the derivatives market. Additionally there are some globally agreed standards falling into place in March 2009, administered by International Swaps and Derivatives Association (ISDA). Two of the key changes are:

1. The introduction of central clearing houses, one for the US and one for Europe. A clearing house acts as the central counterparty to both sides of a CDS transaction, thereby reducing the counterparty risk that both buyer and seller face.

2. The international standardization of CDS contracts, to prevent legal disputes in ambiguous cases where what the payout should be is unclear.

Speaking before the changes went live, Sivan Mahadevan, a derivatives analyst at Morgan Stanley, one of the backers for IntercontinentalExchange's subsidiary, ICE Trust in New York, launched in 2008, claimed that

A clearinghouse, and changes to the contracts to standardize them, will probably boost activity. ... Trading will be much easier.... We'll see new players come to the market because they’ll like the idea of this being a better and more traded product. We also feel like over time we'll see the creation of different types of products (Mahadevan cited in Bloomberg 2009).

In the U.S., central clearing operations began in March 2009, operated by InterContinental Exchange (ICE). A key competitor also interested in entering the CDS clearing sector is CME Group.

In Europe, CDS Index clearing was launched by IntercontinentalExchange's European subsidiary ICE Clear Europe on July 31, 2009. It launched Single Name clearing in Dec 2009. By the end of 2009, it had cleared CDS contracts worth EUR 885 billion reducing the open interest down to EUR 75 billion

By the end of 2009, banks had reclaimed much of their market share; hedge funds had largely retreated from the market after the crises. According to an estimate by the Banque de France, by late 2009 the bank JP Morgan alone now had about 30% of the global CDS market.

==== Government approvals relating to ICE and its competitor CME ====
The SEC's approval for ICE Futures' request to be exempted from rules that would prevent it clearing CDSs was the third government action granted to Intercontinental in one week. On March 3, its proposed acquisition of Clearing Corp., a Chicago clearinghouse owned by eight of the largest dealers in the credit-default swap market, was approved by the Federal Trade Commission and the Justice Department. On March 5, 2009, the Federal Reserve Board, which oversees the clearinghouse, granted a request for ICE to begin clearing.

Clearing Corp. shareholders including JPMorgan Chase & Co., Goldman Sachs Group Inc. and UBS AG, received $39 million in cash from Intercontinental in the acquisition, as well as the Clearing Corp.’s cash on hand and a 50–50 profit-sharing agreement with Intercontinental on the revenue generated from processing the swaps.

SEC spokesperson John Nestor stated

For several months the SEC and our fellow regulators have worked closely with all of the firms wishing to establish central counterparties.... We believe that CME should be in a position soon to provide us with the information necessary to allow the commission to take action on its exemptive requests.

Other proposals to clear credit-default swaps have been made by NYSE Euronext, Eurex AG and LCH.Clearnet Ltd. Only the NYSE effort is available now for clearing after starting on Dec. 22. As of Jan. 30, no swaps had been cleared by the NYSE’s London- based derivatives exchange, according to NYSE Chief Executive Officer Duncan Niederauer.

==== Clearing house member requirements ====
Members of the Intercontinental clearinghouse ICE Trust (now ICE Clear Credit) in March 2009 would have to have a net worth of at least $5 billion (~$7.28 billion in 2025) and a credit rating of A or better to clear their credit-default swap trades. Intercontinental said in the statement today that all market participants such as hedge funds, banks or other institutions are open to become members of the clearinghouse as long as they meet these requirements.

A clearinghouse acts as the buyer to every seller and seller to every buyer, reducing the risk of counterparty defaulting on a transaction. In the over-the-counter market, where credit- default swaps are currently traded, participants are exposed to each other in case of a default. A clearinghouse also provides one location for regulators to view traders’ positions and prices.

=== J.P. Morgan losses ===
In April 2012, hedge fund insiders became aware that the market in credit default swaps was possibly being affected by the activities of Bruno Iksil, a trader at J.P. Morgan Chief Investment Office (CIO), referred to as "the London whale" in reference to the huge positions he was taking. Heavy opposing bets to his positions are known to have been made by traders, including another branch of J.P. Morgan, who purchased the derivatives offered by J.P. Morgan in such high volume. Major losses, $2 billion (~$2.77 billion in 2025), were reported by the firm in May 2012 in relationship to these trades. The disclosure, which resulted in headlines in the media, did not disclose the exact nature of the trading involved, which remains in progress. The item traded, possibly related to CDX IG 9, an index based on the default risk of major U.S. corporations, has been described as a "derivative of a derivative".

== Terms of a typical CDS contract ==
A CDS contract is typically documented under a confirmation referencing the credit derivatives definitions as published by the International Swaps and Derivatives Association. The confirmation typically specifies a reference entity, a corporation or sovereign that generally, although not always, has debt outstanding, and a reference obligation, usually an unsubordinated corporate bond or government bond. The period over which default protection extends is defined by the contract effective date and scheduled termination date.

The confirmation also specifies a calculation agent who is responsible for making determinations as to successors and substitute reference obligations (for example necessary if the original reference obligation was a loan that is repaid before the expiry of the contract), and for performing various calculation and administrative functions in connection with the transaction. By market convention, in contracts between CDS dealers and end-users, the dealer is generally the calculation agent, and in contracts between CDS dealers, the protection seller is generally the calculation agent.

It is not the responsibility of the calculation agent to determine whether or not a credit event has occurred but rather a matter of fact that, pursuant to the terms of typical contracts, must be supported by publicly available information delivered along with a credit event notice. Typical CDS contracts do not provide an internal mechanism for challenging the occurrence or non-occurrence of a credit event and rather leave the matter to the courts if necessary, though actual instances of specific events being disputed are relatively rare.

CDS confirmations also specify the credit events that will give rise to payment obligations by the protection seller and delivery obligations by the protection buyer. Typical credit events include bankruptcy with respect to the reference entity and failure to pay with respect to its direct or guaranteed bond or loan debt. CDS written on North American investment grade corporate reference entities, European corporate reference entities and sovereigns generally also include restructuring as a credit event, whereas trades referencing North American high-yield corporate reference entities typically do not.

Finally, standard CDS contracts specify deliverable obligation characteristics that limit the range of obligations that a protection buyer may deliver upon a credit event. Trading conventions for deliverable obligation characteristics vary for different markets and CDS contract types. Typical limitations include that deliverable debt be a bond or loan, that it have a maximum maturity of 30 years, that it not be subordinated, that it not be subject to transfer restrictions (other than Rule 144A), that it be of a standard currency and that it not be subject to some contingency before becoming due.

The premium payments are generally quarterly, with maturity dates (and likewise premium payment dates) falling on March 20, June 20, September 20, and December 20. Due to the proximity to the IMM dates, which fall on the third Wednesday of these months, these CDS maturity dates are also referred to as "IMM dates".

== Credit default swap and sovereign debt crisis ==
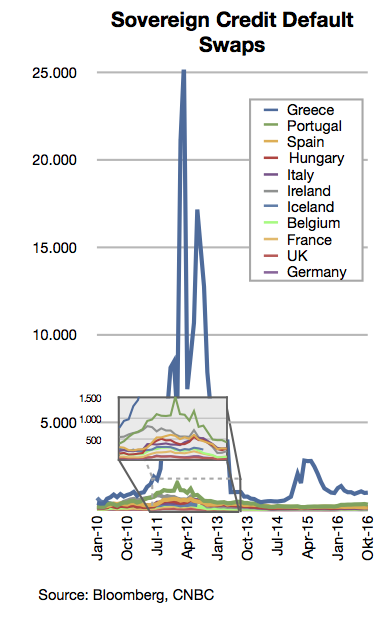
Sovereign credit default swap prices of selected European countries (2010-2011). The left axis is basis points, or 100ths of a percent; a level of 1,000 means it costs $1 million per year to protect $10 million of debt for five years.

The European sovereign debt crisis resulted from a combination of complex factors, including the globalisation of finance; easy credit conditions during the 2002–2008 period that encouraged high-risk lending and borrowing practices; the 2008 financial crisis; international trade imbalances; real estate bubbles that have since burst; the Great Recession; fiscal policy choices related to government revenues and expenses; and approaches used by nations to bail out troubled banking industries and private bondholders, assuming private debt burdens or socialising losses. The Credit default swap market also reveals the beginning of the sovereign crisis.

Since December 1, 2011 the European Parliament has banned naked Credit default swap (CDS) on the debt for sovereign nations.

The definition of restructuring is quite technical but is essentially intended to respond to circumstances where a reference entity, as a result of the deterioration of its credit, negotiates changes in the terms in its debt with its creditors as an alternative to formal insolvency proceedings (i.e. the debt is restructured). During the 2012 Greek government-debt crisis, one important issue was whether the restructuring would trigger Credit default swap (CDS) payments. European Central Bank and the International Monetary Fund negotiators avoided these triggers as they could have jeopardized the stability of major European banks who had been protection writers. An alternative could have been to create new CDS which clearly would pay in the event of debt restructuring. The market would have paid the spread between these and old (potentially more ambiguous) CDS. This practice is far more typical in jurisdictions that do not provide protective status to insolvent debtors similar to that provided by Chapter 11 of the United States Bankruptcy Code. In particular, concerns arising out of Conseco's restructuring in 2000 led to the credit event's removal from North American high yield trades.

== Settlement ==
=== Physical or cash ===
As described in an earlier section, if a credit event occurs then CDS contracts can either be physically settled or cash settled.

- Physical settlement: The protection seller pays the buyer par value, and in return takes delivery of a debt obligation of the reference entity. For example, a hedge fund has bought $5 million worth of protection from a bank on the senior debt of a company. In the event of a default, the bank pays the hedge fund $5 million cash, and the hedge fund must deliver $5 million face value of senior debt of the company (typically bonds or loans, which are typically worth very little given that the company is in default).
- Cash settlement: The protection seller pays the buyer the difference between par value and the market price of a debt obligation of the reference entity. For example, a hedge fund has bought $5 million worth of protection from a bank on the senior debt of a company. This company has now defaulted, and its senior bonds are now trading at 25 (i.e., 25 cents on the dollar) since the market believes that senior bondholders will receive 25% of the money they are owed once the company is wound up (all the defaulting company's liquidable assets are sold off). Therefore, the bank must pay the hedge fund $5 million × (100% − 25%) = $3.75 million.

The development and growth of the CDS market has meant that on many companies there is now a much larger outstanding notional of CDS contracts than the outstanding notional value of its debt obligations. (This is because many parties made CDS contracts for speculative purposes, without actually owning any debt that they wanted to insure against default. See "naked" CDS) For example, at the time it filed for bankruptcy on September 14, 2008, Lehman Brothers had approximately $155 billion of outstanding debt but around $400 billion notional value of CDS contracts had been written that referenced this debt. Clearly not all of these contracts could be physically settled, since there was not enough outstanding Lehman Brothers debt to fulfill all of the contracts, demonstrating the necessity for cash settled CDS trades. The trade confirmation produced when a CDS is traded states whether the contract is to be physically or cash settled.

=== Auctions ===
When a credit event occurs on a major company on which a lot of CDS contracts are written, an auction (also known as a credit-fixing event) may be held to facilitate settlement of a large number of contracts at once, at a fixed cash settlement price. During the auction process participating dealers (e.g., the big investment banks) submit prices at which they would buy and sell the reference entity's debt obligations, as well as net requests for physical settlement against par. A second stage Dutch auction is held following the publication of the initial midpoint of the dealer markets and what is the net open interest to deliver or be delivered actual bonds or loans. The final clearing point of this auction sets the final price for cash settlement of all CDS contracts and all physical settlement requests as well as matched limit offers resulting from the auction are actually settled. According to the International Swaps and Derivatives Association (ISDA), who organised them, auctions have recently proved an effective way of settling the very large volume of outstanding CDS contracts written on companies such as Lehman Brothers and Washington Mutual. Commentator Felix Salmon, however, has questioned in advance ISDA's ability to structure an auction, as defined to date, to set compensation associated with a 2012 bond swap in Greek government debt. For its part, ISDA in the leadup to a 50% or greater "haircut" for Greek bondholders, issued an opinion that the bond swap would not constitute a default event.

Below is a list of the auctions that have been held since 2005.

Date	Name	Final price as a percentage of par
2005-06-14	Collins & Aikman - Senior	43.625
2005-06-23	Collins & Aikman - Subordinated	6.375
2005-10-11	Northwest Airlines	28
2005-10-11	Delta Air Lines	18
2005-11-04	Delphi Corporation	63.375
2006-01-17	Calpine Corporation	19.125
2006-03-31	Dana Holding Corporation	75
2006-11-28	Dura - Senior	24.125
2006-11-28	Dura - Subordinated	3.5
2007-10-23	Movie Gallery	91.5
2008-02-19	Quebecor World	41.25
2008-10-02	Tembec Inc	83
2008-10-06	Fannie Mae - Senior	91.51
2008-10-06	Fannie Mae - Subordinated	99.9
2008-10-06	Freddie Mac - Senior	94
2008-10-06	Freddie Mac - Subordinated	98
2008-10-10	Lehman Brothers	8.625
2008-10-23	Washington Mutual	57
2008-11-04	Landsbanki - Senior	1.25
2008-11-04	Landsbanki - Subordinated	0.125
2008-11-05	Glitnir - Senior	3
2008-11-05	Glitnir - Subordinated	0.125
2008-11-06	Kaupthing - Senior	6.625
2008-11-06	Kaupthing - Subordinated	2.375
2008-12-09	Masonite - LCDS	52.5
2008-12-17	Hawaiian Telcom - LCDS	40.125
2009-01-06	Tribune - CDS	1.5
2009-01-06	Tribune - LCDS	23.75
2009-01-14	Republic of Ecuador	31.375
2009-02-03	Millennium America Inc	7.125
2009-02-03	Lyondell - CDS	15.5
2009-02-03	Lyondell - LCDS	20.75
2009-02-03	EquiStar	27.5
2009-02-05	Sanitec - 1st Lien	33.5
2009-02-05	Sanitec - 2nd Lien	4.0
2009-02-09	British Vita - 1st Lien	15.5
2009-02-09	British Vita - 2nd Lien	2.875
2009-02-10	Nortel Ltd.	6.5
2009-02-10	Nortel Corporation	12
2009-02-19	Smurfit-Stone CDS	8.875
2009-02-19	Smurfit-Stone LCDS	65.375
2009-02-26	Ferretti	10.875
2009-03-09	Aleris	8
2009-03-31	Station Casinos	32
2009-04-14	Chemtura	15
2009-04-14	Great Lakes	18.25
2009-04-15	Rouse	29.25
2009-04-16	LyondellBasell	2
2009-04-17	Abitibi	3.25
2009-04-21	Charter Communications CDS	2.375
2009-04-21	Charter Communications LCDS	78
2009-04-22	Capmark	23.375
2009-04-23	Idearc CDS	1.75
2009-04-23	Idearc LCDS	38.5
2009-05-12	Bowater	15
2009-05-13	General Growth Properties	44.25
2009-05-27	Syncora	15
2009-05-28	Edshcha	3.75
2009-06-09	HLI Operating Corp LCDS	9.5
2009-06-10	Georgia Gulf LCDS	83
2009-06-11	R.H. Donnelley Corp. CDS	4.875
2009-06-12	General Motors CDS	12.5
2009-06-12	General Motors LCDS	97.5
2009-06-18	JSC Alliance Bank CDS	16.75
2009-06-23	Visteon CDS	3
2009-06-23	Visteon LCDS	39
2009-06-24	RH Donnelley Inc LCDS	78.125
2009-07-09	Six Flags CDS	14
2009-07-09	Six Flags LCDS	96.125
2009-07-21	Lear CDS	38.5
2009-07-21	Lear LCDS	66
2009-11-10	METRO-GOLDWYN-MAYER INC. LCDS	58.5
2009-11-20	CIT Group Inc.	68.125
2009-12-09	Thomson	77.75
2009-12-15	Hellas II	1.375
2009-12-16	NJSC Naftogaz of Ukraine	83.5
2010-01-07	Financial Guarantee Insurance Compancy (FGIC)	26
2010-02-18	CEMEX	97.0
2010-03-25	Aiful	33.875
2010-04-15	McCarthy and Stone	70.375
2010-04-22	Japan Airlines Corp	20.0
2010-06-04	Ambac Assurance Corp	20.0
2010-07-15	Truvo Subsidiary Corp	3.0
2010-09-09	Truvo (formerly World Directories)	41.125
2010-09-21	Boston Generating LLC	40.75
2010-10-28	Takefuji Corp	14.75
2010-12-09	Anglo Irish Bank	18.25
2010-12-10	Ambac Financial Group	9.5
2011-11-29	Dynegy Holdings, LLC	71.25
2011-12-09	Seat Pagine Gialle	10.0
2011-12-13	PMI Group	16.5
2011-12-15	AMR Corp	23.5
2012-02-22	Eastman Kodak Co	22.875
2012-03-19	Hellenic Republic	21.75
2012-03-22	Elpida Memory	20.125
2012-03-29	ERC Ireland Fin Ltd	0.0
2012-05-09	Sino Forest Corp	29.0
2012-05-30	Houghton Mifflin Harcourt Publishing Co	55.5
2012-06-06	Residential Cap LLC	17.625
2015-02-19	Caesars Entmt Oper Co Inc	15.875
2015-03-05	Radio Shack Corp	11.5
2015-06-23	Sabine Oil Gas Corp	15.875
2015-09-17	Alpha Appalachia Hldgs Inc	6
2015-10-06	Ukraine	80.625

== Pricing and valuation ==
There are two competing theories usually advanced for the pricing of credit default swaps. The first, referred to herein as the 'probability model', takes the present value of a series of cashflows weighted by their probability of non-default. This method suggests that credit default swaps should trade at a considerably lower spread than corporate bonds.

The second model, proposed by Darrell Duffie, but also by John Hull and Alan White, uses a no-arbitrage approach.

=== Probability model ===
Under the probability model, a credit default swap is priced using a model that takes four inputs; this is similar to the rNPV (risk-adjusted NPV) model used in drug development:

- the "issue premium",
- the recovery rate (percentage of notional repaid in event of default),
- the "credit curve" for the reference entity and
- the "LIBOR curve".

If default events never occurred the price of a CDS would simply be the sum of the discounted premium payments. So CDS pricing models have to take into account the possibility of a default occurring some time between the effective date and maturity date of the CDS contract. For the purpose of explanation we can imagine the case of a one-year CDS with effective date $t_0$ with four quarterly premium payments occurring at times $t_1$, $t_2$, $t_3$, and $t_4$. If the nominal for the CDS is $N$ and the issue premium is $c$ then the size of the quarterly premium payments is $Nc/4$. If we assume for simplicity that defaults can only occur on one of the payment dates then there are five ways the contract could end:

- either it does not have any default at all, so the four premium payments are made and the contract survives until the maturity date, or
- a default occurs on the first, second, third or fourth payment date.

To price the CDS we now need to assign probabilities to the five possible outcomes, then calculate the present value of the payoff for each outcome. The present value of the CDS is then simply the present value of the five payoffs multiplied by their probability of occurring. For a simplified numeric example, see and

This is illustrated in the following tree diagram where at each payment date either the contract has a default event, in which case it ends with a payment of $N(1-R)$ shown in red, where $R$ is the recovery rate, or it survives without a default being triggered, in which case a premium payment of $Nc/4$ is made, shown in blue. At either side of the diagram are the cashflows up to that point in time with premium payments in blue and default payments in red. If the contract is terminated the square is shown with solid shading.

The probability of surviving over the interval $t_{i-1}$ to $t_i$ without a default payment is $p_i$ and the probability of a default being triggered is $1-p_i$. The calculation of present value, given discount factor of $\delta_1$ to $\delta_4$ is then

Description	Premium Payment PV	Default Payment PV	Probability
Default at time $t_1$	$0\,$	$N(1-R) \delta_1\,$	$1-p_1\,$
Default at time $t_2$	$-\frac{Nc}{4} \delta_1$	$N(1-R) \delta_2\,$	$p_1(1-p_2)\,$
Default at time $t_3$	$-\frac{Nc}{4}(\delta_1 + \delta_2)$	$N(1-R) \delta_3\,$	$p_1 p_2 (1-p_3)\,$
Default at time $t_4$	$-\frac{Nc}{4}(\delta_1 + \delta_2 + \delta_3)$	$N(1-R) \delta_4\,$	$p_1 p_2 p_3 (1-p_4)\,$
No defaults	$-\frac{Nc}{4} ( \delta_1 + \delta_2 + \delta_3 + \delta_4 )$	$0\,$	$p_1 p_2 p_3 p_4$

The probabilities $p_1$, $p_2$, $p_3$, $p_4$ can be calculated using the credit spread curve. The probability of no default occurring over a time period from $t$ to $t+\Delta t$ decays exponentially with a time-constant determined by the credit spread, or mathematically $p=\exp(-s(t) \Delta t/(1-R))$ where $s(t)$ is the credit spread zero curve at time $t$. The riskier the reference entity the greater the spread and the more rapidly the survival probability decays with time.

To get the total present value of the credit default swap we multiply the probability of each outcome by its present value to give

$PV=\,$	$(1 - p_1) N(1-R) \delta_1\,$
	$+ p_1 ( 1 - p_2 ) [ N(1-R) \delta_2 - \frac{Nc}{4} \delta_1 ]$
	$+p_1 p_2 ( 1 - p_3 ) [ N(1-R) \delta_3 - \frac{Nc}{4} (\delta_1 + \delta_2) ]$
	$+p_1 p_2 p_3 (1 - p_4) [ N(1-R) \delta_4 - \frac{Nc}{4} (\delta_1 + \delta_2 + \delta_3) ]$
	$-p_1 p_2 p_3 p_4 ( \delta_1 + \delta_2 + \delta_3 + \delta_4 ) \frac{Nc}{4}$

Grouped by cash flow direction (receiving protection and paying premium):

$PV=\,$	$N(1-R) [(1 - p_1) \delta_1 +p_1(1 - p_2) \delta_2 +p_1 p_2(1 - p_3) \delta_3 +p_1 p_2 p_3(1 - p_4) \delta_4]$
	$-\frac{Nc}{4} [p_1 \delta_1 + p_1 p_2 \delta_2 + p_1 p_2 p_3 \delta_3 + p_1 p_2 p_3 p_4 \delta_4 ]$

=== No-arbitrage model ===
In the "no-arbitrage" model proposed by both Duffie, and Hull-White, it is assumed that there is no risk free arbitrage. Duffie uses the LIBOR as the risk free rate, whereas Hull and White use US Treasuries as the risk free rate. Both analyses make simplifying assumptions (such as the assumption that there is zero cost of unwinding the fixed leg of the swap on default), which may invalidate the no-arbitrage assumption. However the Duffie approach is frequently used by the market to determine theoretical prices.

=== Sensitivities ===
Analogous to DV01 for a bond, CS01 - the credit spread dollar value of one basis point - reflects the change in market value of a CDS in response to a one basis point change in its swap premium. CS01 may also be defined as the change in value for a one basis point parallel shift in the credit spread curve. "CS01 Risk", in turn, refers to any unfavorable change in value, in response to changes in underlying credit spreads.

== Criticisms ==
Critics of the huge credit default swap market have claimed that it has been allowed to become too large without proper regulation and that, because all contracts are privately negotiated, the market has no transparency. Furthermore, there have been claims that CDSs exacerbated the 2008 financial crisis by hastening the demise of companies such as Lehman Brothers and AIG.

In the case of Lehman Brothers, it is claimed that the widening of the bank's CDS spread reduced confidence in the bank and ultimately gave it further problems that it was not able to overcome. However, proponents of the CDS market argue that this confuses cause and effect; CDS spreads simply reflected the reality that the company was in serious trouble. Furthermore, they claim that the CDS market allowed investors who had counterparty risk with Lehman Brothers to reduce their exposure in the case of their default.

Credit default swaps have also faced criticism that they contributed to a breakdown in negotiations during the 2009 General Motors Chapter 11 reorganization, because certain bondholders might benefit from the credit event of a GM bankruptcy due to their holding of CDSs. Critics speculate that these creditors had an incentive to push for the company to enter bankruptcy protection. Due to a lack of transparency, there was no way to identify the protection buyers and protection writers.

It was also feared at the time of Lehman's bankruptcy that the $400 billion notional of CDS protection which had been written on the bank could lead to a net payout of $366 billion from protection sellers to buyers (given the cash-settlement auction settled at a final price of 8.625%) and that these large payouts could lead to further bankruptcies of firms without enough cash to settle their contracts. However, industry estimates after the auction suggest that net cashflows were only in the region of $7 billion because many parties held offsetting positions. Furthermore, CDS deals are marked-to-market frequently. This would have led to margin calls from buyers to sellers as Lehman's CDS spread widened, reducing the net cashflows on the days after the auction.

Senior bankers have argued that not only did the CDS market function remarkably well during the 2008 financial crisis; that CDS contracts have been acting to distribute risk just as was intended; and that it is not CDSs themselves that need further regulation but the parties who trade them.

Some general criticism of financial derivatives is also relevant to credit derivatives. Warren Buffett famously described derivatives bought speculatively as "financial weapons of mass destruction." In Berkshire Hathaway's annual report to shareholders in 2002, he said, "Unless derivatives contracts are collateralized or guaranteed, their ultimate value also depends on the creditworthiness of the counterparties to them. In the meantime, though, before a contract is settled, the counterparties record profits and losses—often huge in amount—in their current earnings statements without so much as a penny changing hands. The range of derivatives contracts is limited only by the imagination of man (or sometimes, so it seems, madmen)."

To hedge the counterparty risk of entering a CDS transaction, one practice is to buy CDS protection on one's counterparty. The positions are marked-to-market daily and collateral pass from buyer to seller or vice versa to protect both parties against counterparty default, but money does not always change hands due to the offset of gains and losses by those who had both bought and sold protection. Depository Trust & Clearing Corporation, the clearinghouse for the majority of trades in the US over-the-counter market, stated in October 2008 that once offsetting trades were considered, only an estimated $6 billion would change hands on October 21, during the settlement of the CDS contracts issued on Lehman Brothers' debt, which amounted to somewhere between $150 and $360 billion.

Despite Buffett's criticism on derivatives, in October 2008 Berkshire Hathaway revealed to regulators that it has entered into at least $4.85 billion in derivative transactions. Buffett stated in his 2008 letter to shareholders that Berkshire Hathaway has no counterparty risk in its derivative dealings because Berkshire require counterparties to make payments when contracts are initiated, so that Berkshire always holds the money. Berkshire Hathaway was a large owner of Moody's stock during the period that it was one of two primary rating agencies for subprime CDOs, a form of mortgage security derivative dependent on the use of credit default swaps.

The monoline insurance companies got involved with writing credit default swaps on mortgage-backed CDOs. Some media reports have claimed this was a contributing factor to the downfall of some of the monolines. In 2009 one of the monolines, MBIA, sued Merrill Lynch, claiming that Merrill had misrepresented some of its CDOs to MBIA in order to persuade MBIA to write CDS protection for those CDOs.

=== Systemic risk ===
During the 2008 financial crisis, counterparties became subject to a risk of default, amplified with the involvement of Lehman Brothers and AIG in a very large number of CDS transactions. This is an example of systemic risk, risk which threatens an entire market, and a number of commentators have argued that size and deregulation of the CDS market have increased this risk.

For example, imagine if a hypothetical mutual fund had bought some Washington Mutual corporate bonds in 2005 and decided to hedge their exposure by buying CDS protection from Lehman Brothers. After Lehman's default, this protection was no longer active, and Washington Mutual's sudden default only days later would have led to a massive loss on the bonds, a loss that should have been insured by the CDS. There was also fear that Lehman Brothers and AIG's inability to pay out on CDS contracts would lead to the unraveling of complex interlinked chain of CDS transactions between financial institutions.

Chains of CDS transactions can arise from a practice known as "netting". Here, company B may buy a CDS from company A with a certain annual premium, say 2%. If the condition of the reference company worsens, the risk premium rises, so company B can sell a CDS to company C with a premium of say, 5%, and pocket the 3% difference. However, if the reference company defaults, company B might not have the assets on hand to make good on the contract. It depends on its contract with company A to provide a large payout, which it then passes along to company C.

The problem lies if one of the companies in the chain fails, creating a "domino effect" of losses. For example, if company A fails, company B will default on its CDS contract to company C, possibly resulting in bankruptcy, and company C will potentially experience a large loss due to the failure to receive compensation for the bad debt it held from the reference company. Even worse, because CDS contracts are private, company C will not know that its fate is tied to company A; it is only doing business with company B.

As described above, the establishment of a central exchange or clearing house for CDS trades would help to solve the "domino effect" problem, since it would mean that all trades faced a central counterparty guaranteed by a consortium of dealers.

== Tax and accounting issues ==
The U.S federal income tax treatment of CDS is uncertain (Nirenberg and Kopp 1997:1, Peaslee & Nirenberg 2008-07-21:129 and Brandes 2008). (Note: The link is to an earlier version of this paper.) Commentators have suggested that, depending on how they are drafted, they are either notional principal contracts or options for tax purposes,(Peaslee & Nirenberg 2008-07-21:129). but this is not certain. There is a risk of having CDS recharacterized as different types of financial instruments because they resemble put options and credit guarantees. In particular, the degree of risk depends on the type of settlement (physical/cash and binary/FMV) and trigger (default only/any credit event) (Nirenberg & Kopp 1997:8). And, as noted below, the appropriate treatment for Naked CDS may be entirely different.

If a CDS is a notional principal contract, pre-default periodic and nonperiodic payments on the swap are deductible and included in ordinary income. If a payment is a termination payment, or a payment received on a sale of the swap to a third party, however, its tax treatment is an open question. In 2004, the Internal Revenue Service announced that it was studying the characterization of CDS in response to taxpayer confusion. As the outcome of its study, the IRS issued proposed regulations in 2011 specifically classifying CDS as notional principal contracts, and thereby qualifying such termination and sale payments for favorable capital gains tax treatment. These proposed regulations, which are yet to be finalized, have already been subject to criticism at a public hearing held by the IRS in January 2012, as well as in the academic press, insofar as that classification would apply to Naked CDS.

The thrust of this criticism is that Naked CDS are indistinguishable from gambling wagers, and thus give rise in all instances to ordinary income, including to hedge fund managers on their so-called carried interests, and that the IRS exceeded its authority with the proposed regulations. This is evidenced by the fact that Congress confirmed that certain derivatives, including CDS, do constitute gambling when, in 2000, to allay industry fears that they were illegal gambling, it exempted them from "any State or local law that prohibits or regulates gaming." While this decriminalized Naked CDS, it did not grant them relief under the federal gambling tax provisions.

The accounting treatment of CDS used for hedging may not parallel the economic effects and instead, increase volatility. For example, GAAP generally require that CDS be reported on a mark to market basis. In contrast, assets that are held for investment, such as a commercial loan or bonds, are reported at cost, unless a probable and significant loss is expected. Thus, hedging a commercial loan using a CDS can induce considerable volatility into the income statement and balance sheet as the CDS changes value over its life due to market conditions and due to the tendency for shorter dated CDS to sell at lower prices than longer dated CDS. One can try to account for the CDS as a hedge under FASB 133 but in practice that can prove very difficult unless the risky asset owned by the bank or corporation is exactly the same as the Reference Obligation used for the particular CDS that was bought.

== LCDS ==
A new type of default swap is the "loan only" credit default swap (LCDS). This is conceptually very similar to a standard CDS, but unlike "vanilla" CDS, the underlying protection is sold on syndicated secured loans of the Reference Entity rather than the broader category of "Bond or Loan". Also, as of May 22, 2007, for the most widely traded LCDS form, which governs North American single name and index trades, the default settlement method for LCDS shifted to auction settlement rather than physical settlement. The auction method is essentially the same that has been used in the various ISDA cash settlement auction protocols, but does not require parties to take any additional steps following a credit event (i.e., adherence to a protocol) to elect cash settlement. On October 23, 2007, the first ever LCDS auction was held for Movie Gallery.

Because LCDS trades are linked to secured obligations with much higher recovery values than the unsecured bond obligations that are typically assumed the cheapest to deliver in respect of vanilla CDS, LCDS spreads are generally much tighter than CDS trades on the same name.

== ISDA Definitions ==
During the rapid growth of the credit derivatives market the 1999 ISDA Credit Derivatives Definitions were introduced to standardize the legal documentation of CDS. Subsequently, replaced with the 2003 ISDA Credit Derivatives Definitions, and later the 2014 ISDA Credit Derivatives Definitions, each definition update seeks to ensure the CDS payoffs closely mimic the economics of the underlying reference obligations (bonds).

== See also ==
- Bucket shop (stock market)
- Constant maturity credit default swap
- Credit default option
- Credit default swap index
- CUSIP Linked MIP Code, reference entity code
- Inside Job (2010 film), an Oscar-winning documentary film about the 2008 financial crisis by Charles H. Ferguson
- PAUG
- Recovery swap
- Toxic security
- Intercontinental Exchange
