= Investor awareness =

Investor Awareness is a term used in investor relations, by public companies and similar bodies, to describe how well their investors, and the investment market in general, know their business. Its significance is that investors are expected to base their investment decisions on awareness and knowledge, and a lack of these may lead to a low profile amongst its peers in the market (i.e. competing businesses and investment opportunities), to the detriment of the business.

== More ==
Investor awareness is knowledge the investment community has of a company. It can be looked at like this: “Do investors know about your company?” If the answer is “yes,” then it could be said that the company has “good investor awareness” which means investors have knowledge of, are conscious of, or have a perception of a company and are very aware of its products and services. If we were to assume that a company has “no investor awareness” or “poor investor awareness,” then the company has probably done a poor job at creating visibility in the investment community and likely no one outside of the company's offices (or friends and family) has knowledge of the company.
