= Medicinal Liquor Prescriptions Act of 1933 =

- Long title: An Act relating to the prescribing of medicinal liquors.
- Nicknames: National Prohibition Act Amendment of 1933
- Enacted by: the 73rd United States Congress
- Effective: March 31, 1933

Citations
- Public law: Pub. L. 73–6
- Statutes at Large: 48 Stat. 23

Codification
- Acts amended: Willis–Campbell Act
- Titles amended: 27 U.S.C.: Intoxicating Liquors
- U.S.C. sections amended: 27 U.S.C. ch. 1 §§ 1-3

Legislative history
- Introduced in the Senate as S. 562 on March 28, 1933; Committee consideration by Senate Judiciary, House Judiciary; Passed the Senate on March 29, 1933 (Passed); Passed the House on March 30, 1933 (Passed, in lieu of H.R. 1718); Signed into law by President Franklin D. Roosevelt on March 31, 1933

Medicinal Liquor Prescriptions Act of 1933 is a United States federal statute establishing prescription limitations for physicians possessing a permit to dispense medicinal liquor. The public law seek to abolish the use of the medicinal liquor prescription form introducing medicinal liquor revenue stamps as a substitution for official prescription blanks.

The Act of Congress amended Title II - Prohibition of Intoxicating Beverages as enacted by the National Prohibition Act of 1919. The prohibition law, better known as the Volstead Act, was amended twelve years before by the 67th United States Congress authorizing dispensary restrictions of alcohol by druggists or physicians. The public law was entitled the National Prohibition Supplemental Act of 1921.

The 72nd United States Congress pursued passage of a medicinal liquor regulatory bill ahead of the Congressional session expiration occurring on March 4, 1933. House bill 14395 went before the United States House of Representatives on February 25, 1933, resulting in a one hundred and sixty-eight to one hundred and sixty narrow margin vote.

Senate bill 562 was passed by the 73rd U.S. Congress and enacted into law by President Franklin Roosevelt on March 31, 1933.

== See also ==
Absinthe	History of medicine in the United States
Denatured alcohol	History of pharmacy in the United States
Elixir	Liquor
Emory Buckner	Mint julep
Excise tax in the United States	Moonshine
History of alcoholic drinks	Rectified spirit

== Illustrations ==
Prohibition Era Liquor Prescription Forms
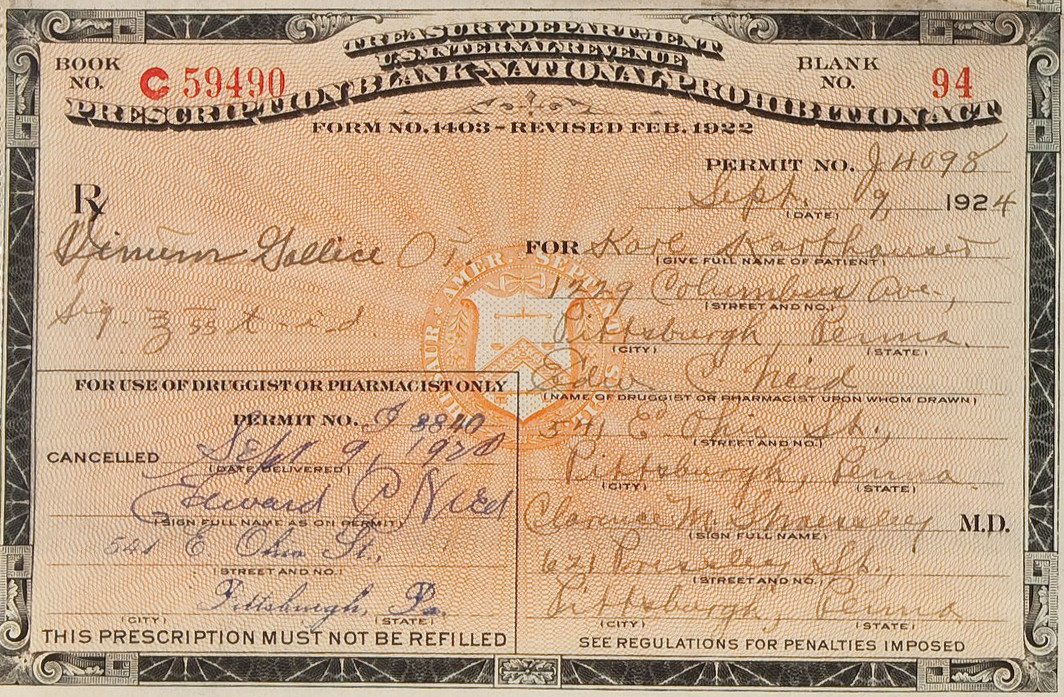
Early 1920s prescription form for medicinal liquor

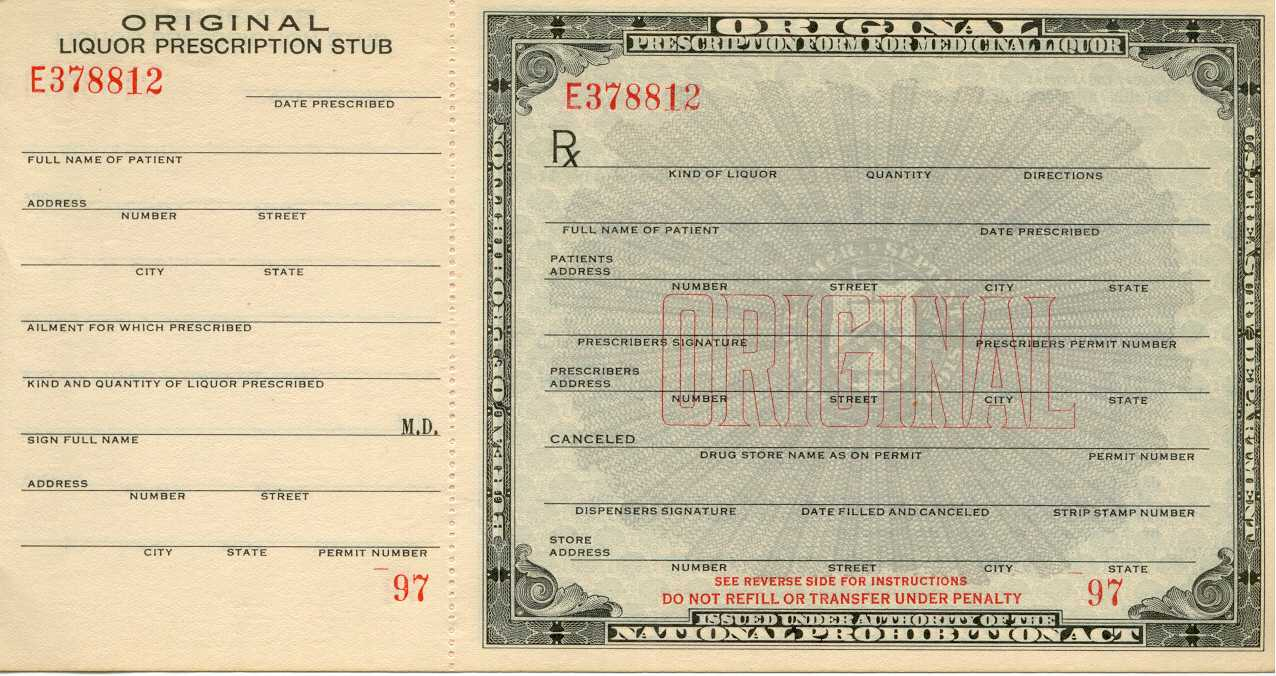
Late 1920s prescription form for medicinal liquor

== Periodical Bibliography ==
- "Internal Revenue Commissioner Outlines Regulations on Druggists and Physicians". New York Times. July 1, 1919.
- "Revenue Collector Tells How Prescriptions May Be Filled Under Treasury Decision". New York Times. July 30, 1919.
- "Roping the Doctor with Red Tape". New York Times. January 11, 1920.
- "Physicians Endorse Whisky as Medicine". New York Times. May 23, 1922.
- "Liquor Fraud Laid to 27 Physicians". New York Times. March 17, 1926.
- "Warrants are Issued for 15 More Doctors". New York Times. March 26, 1926.
- "Distilling of Whisky to be Authorized Soon to Add 1,500,000 Gallons to Medicinal Stock". New York Times. July 16, 1929.
