= Codification (law) =

Process of collecting and restating certain area of law forming a legal code

In law, codification is the process of collecting and restating the law of a jurisdiction in certain areas, usually by subject, forming a legal code, i.e. a codex (book) of law.

Codification is one of the defining features for most civil law jurisdictions. In common law systems, such as that of English law, codification is the process of converting and consolidating judge-made law or uncodified statutes enacted by the legislature into codified statute law.

== History ==
Ancient Sumer's Code of Ur-Nammu was compiled circa 2050–1230 BC, and is the earliest known surviving civil code. Three centuries later, the Babylonian king Hammurabi enacted the set of laws named after him.

Important codifications were developed in the ancient Roman Empire, with the compilations of the Lex Duodecim Tabularum and much later the Corpus Juris Civilis. These codified laws were the exceptions rather than the rule, however, as during much of ancient times Roman laws were left mostly uncodified.

The first permanent system of codified laws could be found in imperial China, (Note: See Chinese law.) with the compilation of the Tang Code in AD 624. This formed the basis of the Chinese criminal code, which was eventually replaced by the Great Qing Legal Code, which was in turn abolished in 1912 following the Xinhai Revolution and the establishment of the Republic of China. The new laws of the Republic of China were inspired by the German codified work, the Bürgerliches Gesetzbuch. A very influential example in Europe was the French Napoleonic Code of 1804.

Upon confederation, the Iroquois created constitutional wampum, each component symbolizing one of the many laws within the 117 articles. The union of the five original nations occurred in 1142, and its unification narrative served the basis for the Iroquois laws.

Systems of religious laws include the halakha of Judaism and the sharia of Islam. The use of civil codes in sharia began with the Ottoman Empire in the 19th century. American legal scholar Noah Feldman has written that the Ottoman codification of the sharia reduced the power of the religious scholarly class, upsetting the balance of powers and the traditional uncodified constitution of Islamic societies and leading to the rise of autocrats unconstrained by rule of law in the Muslim world.

== Civil law jurisdictions ==
Civil law jurisdictions rely, by definition, on codification. Notable early examples were the Statutes of Lithuania, in the 16th century. The movement towards codification gained momentum during the Enlightenment, and was implemented in several European countries during the late 18th century (see civil code). However, it became widespread only after the enactment of the French Napoleonic Code (1804), which has heavily influenced the legal systems of many other countries.

The Napoleonic Code of 1804 served as a primary model for legal codification across Continental Europe and Latin America, effectively abolishing feudal legal structures in favor of uniform civil laws.

== Common law jurisdictions ==
Common law has been codified in many jurisdictions and in many areas of law: examples include criminal codes in many jurisdictions, and include the California Civil Code and the Consolidated Laws of New York (New York State).

=== England and Wales ===
The English judge Sir Mackenzie Chalmers is renowned as the draftsman of the Bills of Exchange Act 1882, the Sale of Goods Act 1893 and the Marine Insurance Act 1906, all of which codified existing common law principles. The Sale of Goods Act was repealed and re-enacted by the Sale of Goods Act 1979 in a manner that revealed how sound the 1893 original had been. (Note: For the most part, the Sale of Goods Act 1979 retains the wording and section numbers of its 1893 predecessor.) The Marine Insurance Act (mildly amended) has been a notable success, adopted verbatim in many common law jurisdictions.

Most of England's criminal laws have been codified, partly because this enables precision and certainty in prosecution. However, large areas of the common law, such as the law of contract and the law of tort, remain remarkably untouched. In the last 80 years there have been statutes that address immediate problems, such as the Law Reform (Frustrated Contracts) Act 1943 (which, inter alia, coped with contracts rendered void by war), and the Contracts (Rights of Third Parties) Act 1999, which amended the doctrine of privity. However, there has been no progress on the adoption of Harvey McGregor's Contract Code (1993), even though the Law Commission, together with the Scots Law Commission, asked him to produce a proposal for the comprehensive codification and unification of the contract law of England and Scotland. Similarly, codification in the law of tort has been at best piecemeal, a rare example of progress being the Law Reform (Contributory Negligence) Act 1945.

Consolidation bills are routinely passed to organize the law.

=== Ireland ===
Law of the Republic of Ireland evolved from English law, the greatest point of difference being the existence of the Constitution of Ireland as a single document. The unofficial "popular edition" of the Constitution is regularly updated to take account of amendments to it, while the official text enrolled in the Supreme Court in 1938 has been replaced five times: in 1942, 1980, 1989, 1999, and 2019. As in England, subordinate laws are not officially codified, although consolidation bills have restated the law in many areas. Since 2006 the Law Reform Commission (LRC) has published semi-official "revised" editions of Acts of the Oireachtas taking account of textual and other amendments to the original version. The Finance Acts are excluded from the LRC programme. Private companies produce unofficial consolidated versions of these and other commercially important pre-2005 laws. An official advisory committee between 2006 and 2010 produced a Draft Criminal Code.

=== United States ===
==== The early codification movement ====
In the United States, a critique of the inherited English tradition of common law and an argument for systematic codification was championed by the United Irish exiles William Sampson (admitted to the New York bar in 1806), and William Duane publisher of the Jeffersonian paper, the Philadelphia Aurora. In 1810, Sampson published Trial of the Journeymen Cordwainers of the City of New-York for a Conspiracy to Raise Their Wages, commentary on his (unsuccessful) argument in The People v Melvin (1806) to quash an indictment of illegal worker combination. Insisting on the supremacy of the elected legislature, Sampson's objected that the prosecution was reasoning "abstractedly" from principles of English common law without any reference to statute. It was this, alone, that allowed them to deny journeymen the right to "conspire against starvation" while, without notice or challenge, leaving master tradesmen in a "permanent conspiracy" to suppress wages. He went on to argue that an "indiscriminating adoption of common law" had caused the New-World society to carry over "barbarities" from the Old: laws that "can only be executed upon those not favoured by fortune with certain privileges" and that in some cases operate "entirely against the poor".

Sampson's summary Discourse on the Common Law (1823), holding common law to be contrary to the ethos a democratic republic and urging, with reference to the Code Napoleon, its replacement by a general law of reference, was hailed as "the most sweeping indictment of common law idealism ever written in America" . It was a source of inspiration for Edward Livingston who drew upon French, and other European, civil law in drafting the 1825 Louisiana Code of Procedure. Later, Sampson's efforts appeared vindicated in New York where in 1846 a new state constitution directed that the whole body of state law be reduced to a written and systematic code, and in David Dudley Field's subsequent drafting of the New York Code of Civil Procedure (1848).

Sampson sought to disassociate codification from the doctrinaire insistence on positive legislation that had marked Jeremy Bentham's championing of the cause in Britain. But, focussing on the French experience, critics thought it sufficient to comment on the futility of trying to compress human behaviour into rigid categories. President Thomas Jefferson had remained neutral when Duane's attempted to force the issue in the 1805 election in Pennsylvania. Federalists joined with "Constitutional Republicans" to defeat the reform agenda.

==== Present status ====
===== Statutory =====
In the United States, acts of Congress, such as federal statutes, are published chronologically in the order in which they become law – often by being signed by the President, on an individual basis in official pamphlets called "slip laws", and are grouped together in official bound book form, also chronologically, as "session laws". The "session law" publication for Federal statutes is called the United States Statutes at Large. A given act may be a single page or hundreds of pages in length. An act may be classified as either a "Public Law" or a "Private Law".

Because each Congressional act may contain laws on a variety of topics, many acts, or portions thereof, are also rearranged and published in a topical, subject matter codification by the Office of the Law Revision Counsel. The official codification of Federal statutes is called the United States Code. Generally, only "Public Laws" are codified. The United States Code is divided into "titles" (based on overall topics) numbered 1 through 54. Title 18, for example, contains many of the Federal criminal statutes. Title 26 is the Internal Revenue Code.

Even in code form, however, many statutes by their nature pertain to more than one topic. For example, the statute making tax evasion a felony pertains to both criminal law and tax law, but is found only in the Internal Revenue Code. Other statutes pertaining to taxation are found not in the Internal Revenue Code but instead, for example, in the Bankruptcy Code in Title 11 of the United States Code, or the Judiciary Code in Title 28. Another example is the national minimum drinking age, not found in Title 27, Intoxicating liquors, but in Title 23, Highways, §158.

Further, portions of some Congressional acts, such as the provisions for the effective dates of amendments to codified laws, are themselves not codified at all. These statutes may be found by referring to the acts as published in "slip law" and "session law" form. However, commercial publications that specialize in legal materials often arrange and print the uncodified statutes with the codes to which they pertain.

In the United States, the individual states, either officially or through private commercial publishers, generally follow the same three-part model for the publication of their own statutes: slip law, session law, and codification.

===== Regulatory =====
Rules and regulations that are promulgated by agencies of the Executive Branch of the United States Federal Government are published in the Federal Register and codified in the Code of Federal Regulations. These regulations are authorized by specific legislation passed by the legislative branch, and generally have the same force as statutory law.

== International law codification ==
Following the First World War and the establishment of the League of Nations, the need for codification of international law arose. In September 1924, the General Assembly of the League established a committee of experts for the purpose of codification of international law, which was defined by the Assembly as consisting of two aspects:

- Putting existing customs into written international agreements
- Developing further rules

In 1930 the League of Nations held at the Hague a conference for the purpose of codification of rules on general matters, but very little progress was made.

Following the Second World War, the International Law Commission was established within the United Nations as a permanent body for the formulation of principles in international law.

== Canon law codification ==
Papal attempts at codification of the scattered mass of canon law spanned the eight centuries since Gratian produced his Decretum c. 1150. In the 13th century especially canon law became the object of scientific study, and different compilations were made by the Roman Pontiffs. The most important of these were the five books of the Decretales Gregorii IX and the Liber Sextus of Boniface VIII. The legislation grew with time. Some of it became obsolete, and contradictions crept in so that it became difficult in recent times to discover what was of obligation and where to find the law on a particular question.

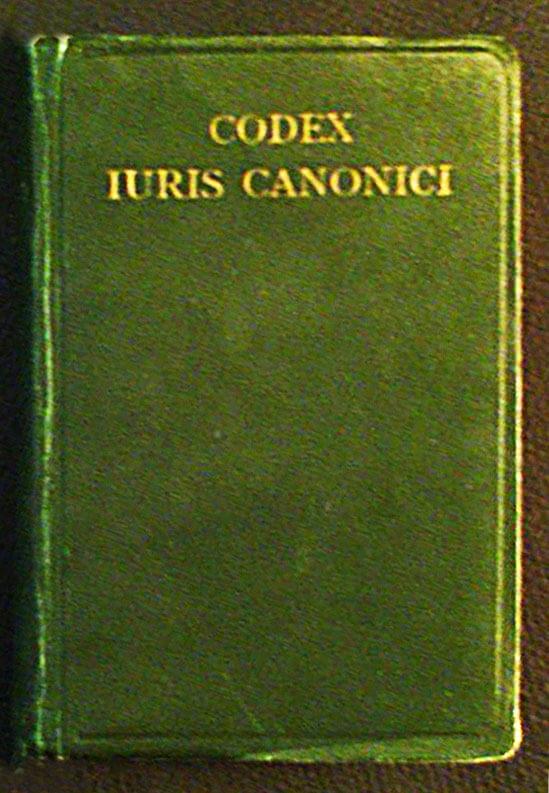
Hardcover of the 1917 Code of Canon Law

Since the close of the ‘’Corpus Juris’’ numerous new laws and decrees had been issued by popes, councils, and Roman Congregations. No complete collection of them had ever been published and they remained scattered through the ponderous volumes of the ‘’Bullaria’’ the ‘’Acta Sanctae Sedis’’, and other such compilations, which were accessible to only a few and for professional canonists themselves and formed an unwieldy mass of legal material. Moreover, not a few ordinances, whether included in the ‘’Corpus Juris’’ or of more recent date, appeared to be contradictory; some had been formally abrogated, others had become obsolete by long disuse; others, again, had ceased to be useful or applicable in the present condition of society. Great confusion was thus engendered and correct knowledge of the law rendered very difficult even for those who had to enforce it.

When the Vatican Council met in 1869 a number of bishops of different countries petitioned for a new compilation of church law that would be clear and easily studied. The council never finished its work and no attempt was made to bring the legislation up to date. By the 19th Century, this body of legislation included some 10,000 norms. Many of these were difficult to reconcile with one another due to changes in circumstances and practice. In response to the request of the bishops at the First Vatican Council, on 14 May 1904, with the motu proprio Arduum sane munus ("A Truly Arduous Task"), Pope Pius X set up a commission to begin reducing these diverse documents into a single code, presenting the normative portion in the form of systematic short canons shorn of the preliminary considerations ("Whereas...") and omitting those parts that had been superseded by later developments.

By the winter of 1912, the "whole span of the code" had been completed, so that a provisional text was printed. This 1912 text was sent out to all Latin bishops and superiors general for their comment, and their notations which they sent back to the codification commission were subsequently printed and distributed to all members of the commission, in order that the members might carefully consider the suggestions. The new code was completed in 1916. Under the aegis of Cardinal Pietro Gasparri, the Commission for the Codification of Canon Law was completed under Benedict XV, Pius X's successor, who promulgated it on 27 May 1917 as the Code of Canon Law (Latin: Codex Iuris Canonici) and set 19 May 1918 as the date on which it came into force. In its preparation centuries of material were examined, scrutinized for authenticity by leading experts, and harmonized as much as possible with opposing canons and even other codes, from the Codex of Justinian to the Napoleonic Code. It contained 2,414 canons and was in force until Canon 6 §1 1° of the 1983 Code of Canon Law took legal effect—thereby abrogating it—on 27 November 1983.

== Recodification ==
Recodification refers to a process where existing codified statutes are reformatted and rewritten into a new codified structure. This is often necessary as, over time, the legislative process of amending statutes and the legal process of construing statutes by nature over time results in a code that contains archaic terms, superseded text, and redundant or conflicting statutes. Due to the size of a typical government code, the legislative process of recodification of a code can often take a decade or longer.
