= Willis–Campbell Act =

U.S. Prohibition-era law

- Other short titles: Alcoholic Liquor Traffic Act; Beer Emergency Bill; National Prohibition Definition Act; Supplementary Volstead Act
- Long title: An Act Supplemental to the National Prohibition Act.
- Nicknames: National Prohibition Supplemental Act of 1921
- Enacted by: the 67th United States Congress
- Effective: November 23, 1921

Citations
- Public law: Pub. L. 67–96
- Statutes at Large: 42 Stat. 222

Codification
- Titles amended: 27 U.S.C.: Intoxicating Liquors
- U.S.C. sections amended: 27 U.S.C. ch. 1 §§ 2, 3, 5

Legislative history
- Introduced in the House as H.R. 7294 by Philip P. Campbell (R–KS) on June 2, 1921; Committee consideration by House Judiciary, Senate Judiciary, House Rules; Passed the House on June 27, 1921 (268–102); Passed the Senate on August 8, 1921 (46–21); Reported by the joint conference committee on August 16, 1921; agreed to by the House on August 23, 1921 (agreed) and by the Senate on November 18, 1921 (62–24); Signed into law by President Warren G. Harding on November 23, 1921

Major amendments
- Medicinal Liquor Prescriptions Act of 1933

United States Supreme Court cases
- Lambert v. Yellowley

The Willis–Campbell Act of 1921 was a piece of legislation in the United States intended to clarify and tighten regulations around the medicinal use of alcohol during Prohibition. The law, sponsored by Republican Sen. Frank B. Willis of Ohio and Rep. Philip P. Campbell of Kansas, specified that only "spirituous and vinous liquors" (i.e. spirits and wine, thus excluding beer) could be prescribed medicinally, reduced the maximum amount of alcohol per prescription to half a pint, and limited doctors to 100 prescriptions for alcohol per 90-day period. It was commonly known as the "beer emergency bill".

The Act kept in force all anti-liquor tax laws that had been in place before the passage of the Volstead Act in 1919, giving authorities the right to choose whether or not to prosecute offenders under prohibition laws or revenue laws, but at the same time guaranteeing bootleggers that they would not be prosecuted in both ways.
