= Revenue stamps of Hawaii =

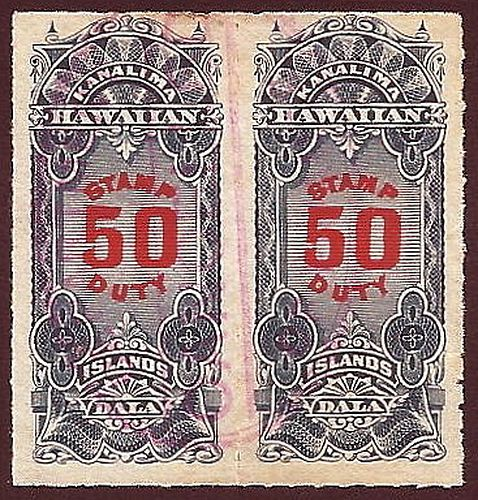
The $50 value issued in March 1879

Revenue stamps of Hawaii were first issued in late 1876 by the Kingdom of Hawaii to pay taxes according to the Stamp Duty Act of 1876, although embossed revenue stamps had been introduced decades earlier in around 1845. The stamps issued in 1876–79 were used for over three decades, remaining in use during the Provisional Government, the Republic and after Hawaii became a U.S. Territory. Some changes were made along the years: from rouletted to perforated, and some new values, colours, designs and overprints were added. Some postage stamps were briefly valid for fiscal use in 1886–88 to pay for a tax on opium imports, and a stamp in a new design was issued for customs duties in 1897. A liquor stamp was issued in 1905.

Revenue stamps of the United States were introduced in Hawaii in 1900, but the islands continued to issue their own stamps for almost another two decades, until Stamp Duty was repealed in 1917 and the revenue stamps were withdrawn. Since then, the only stamps issued include a taxpaid stamp of the Department of Agriculture and Forestry in the 1930s, egg inspection stamps and conveyance tax meter stamps in the 1960s, and cigarette taxpaid labels which have been used since 2001.

== Kingdom ==
Colorless, green or black embossed revenue stamps were first used by the Kingdom of Hawaii in around 1845, and various different types remained in use until the end of the 19th century.

The Ministry of Finance of the Kingdom of Hawaii issued its first set of revenue stamps on December 22, 1876, when new taxes on deeds, agreements, bills of landing and other documents were introduced following the Stamp Duty Act of 1876. The first stamps to be issued were 25c and 50c values, with a $1 value being added in about March 1877, and $5, $10 and $50 values about March 1879. The stamps had numeral designs, with the dollar values being written as dala. The name of the country was expressed as HAWAIIAN ISLANDS, and the issue was rouletted. The stamps were printed by the American Bank Note Company in New York City and were probably designed by Registrar J. O. Carter.

Hawaii introduced a tax of $1 on the import of each half pound of opium in 1886. The $1 revenue of 1877 was initially used, but after stocks were running short the 1883 $1 postage stamp depicting Queen Emma was used to pay the tax. Pairs of the 50c stamp from the same issue (which depicted King Lunalilo) might have also been used for this purpose. A number of different cancellations are known on the $1 postage stamp denoting fiscal use: three different types with Maltese cross designs in black or purple, one with the initials J.M.K. (John Mākini Kapena, Collector General of Customs 1886–87) in purple and another with a handstamped script signature of Archibald Scott Cleghorn (Collector General of Customs 1887–93) in purple. Opium import was banned in 1888 and postage stamps were no longer used for this purpose.

A tax on playing cards was approved by Queen Liliʻuokalani by an Act of August 4, 1892. A 25c banderole stamp was planned for this purpose, but it was never issued since the tax was repealed by President Sanford B. Dole on April 24, 1893.

== Provisional Government ==
Days before the overthrow of the Kingdom of Hawaii, on January 11, 1893, Queen Liliʻuokalani approved reducing the tax on stock certificates from 25c per $100 to 20c. The new rate became effective on April 1, 1893, at the time when Hawaii was ruled by the Provisional Government. New 20c stamps were ordered from the San Francisco printer H. S. Crocker and Company, but due to an error 25c stamps were printed instead, in a similar design as 1876 Stamp Duty issues but in a new color. The error was recognized immediately and a new order was placed for the required 20c stamps. Both the correct 20c stamps and the error 25c stamps were issued in Hawaii, and it is possible that the 25c stamps were sold for 20c. These stamps exist perforated or imperforate.

== Republic ==
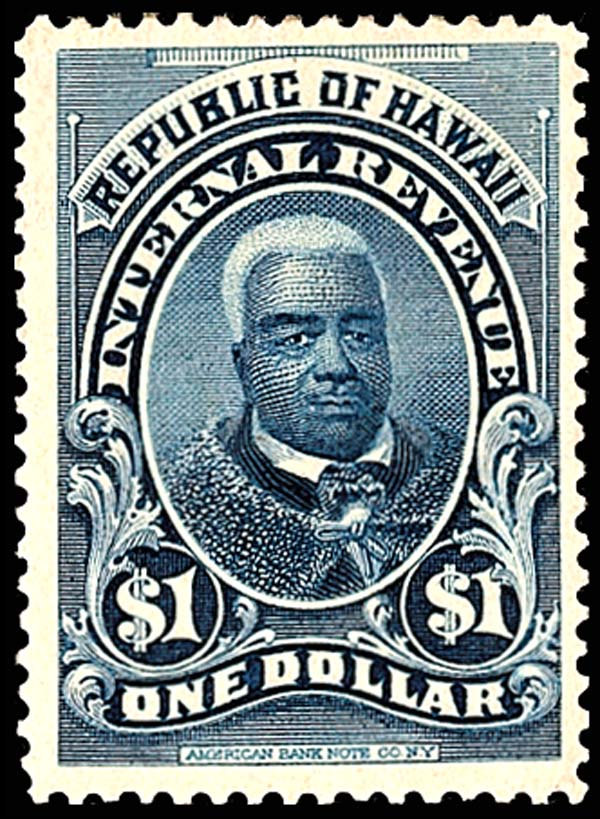
The $1 value issued in 1897, depicting Kamehameha I

During the Republic of Hawaii, the previous issues remained in use, with reprints being made of the $1 stamp of 1876. In 1897, a new $1 value was issued with a new design depicting Hawaii's first king, Kamehameha I. This stamp was inscribed REPUBLIC OF HAWAII INTERNAL REVENUE, and it was issued to pay Customs duties. It was printed by the American Bank Note Company.

By April 1898, stocks of the 20c printed in 1893 began to run low, so old stocks of the 25c green of 1876 were overprinted with the required value and the text REPUBLIC OF HAWAII in gold. A number of errors such as double or inverted overprints are known.

== U.S. Territory ==
Hawaii became a U.S. Territory in 1898 and the Territorial Government was established in 1900. Taxes by the U.S. Internal Revenue Service became applicable to the islands, and revenue stamps of the United States were introduced. However, the Territorial Government could still impose taxes on some documents, and Hawaii revenue stamps remained in use.

The first stamp issued by the Territory of Hawaii in 1900 was another 20c overprint on the old 25c from 1876. Unlike the 1898 issue, this was in black and only bore the new value. An error exists with the surcharge inverted.

A $50 stamp was also issued in 1900 in the same design as the first issue but with the inscription reading TERRITORY OF HAWAII. Like the original issue, this was printed by the American Bank Note Company and it was rouletted. An exempt stamp denoted NOT LIABLE TO DUTY was issued some time later, and this was perforated instead of rouletted. Little is known about this stamp, and its printer is unknown. It is recorded used from 1910 to 1917.

A final set of revenue stamps was issued between 1909 and 1913. This had the same designs as the first issue, with identical inscriptions and colours, but were perforated instead of rouletted. It was printed by the American Bank Note Company. Four values were issued: the $5 and $10 in 1909, and the 50c and $1 in 1913. The $5 exists with the centre inverted, and this is Hawaii's rarest revenue.

The stamps were withdrawn when Stamp Duty was repealed in 1917. Remainders available at the time included the 25c of 1876, the $1 of 1897, and the four stamps issued in 1909–13.

An adhesive liquor seal was issued in 1905 by the Office of the Treasurer of the Territory of Hawaii. This was affixed to containers of liquor to be sold by fifth class licences, and it is extremely rare.

The Department of Agriculture and Forestry issued an undenominated, taxpaid stamp in the 1930s to pay for cultivation permits.

== U.S. State ==
A vertical coil tape for Egg Inspection was reportedly issued in 1964. Documentary meter stamps for conveyance tax were introduced in 1967.

Heat transfer decal taxpaid labels have been used to pay cigarette taxes since 2001.

== See also ==
- Postage stamps and postal history of Hawaii
- Revenue stamps of the United States
