= Increased Penalties Act =

Prohibition-era US federal law

- Other short titles: Jones Act; Jones–Stalker Act
- Long title: An Act to amend the National Prohibition Act, as amended and supplemented.
- Nicknames: Prohibition Penalties Act
- Enacted by: the 70th United States Congress
- Effective: March 2, 1929

Citations
- Public law: 70-899
- Statutes at Large: 45 Stat. 1446

Codification
- Acts amended: National Prohibition Act
- Titles amended: 27 U.S.C.: Intoxicating Liquors
- U.S.C. sections created: 27 U.S.C. ch. 4 §§ 91, 92

Legislative history
- Introduced in the Senate as S. 2901 by Wesley Livsey Jones (R–WA) on April 10, 1928; Committee consideration by Senate Judiciary, House Judiciary; Passed the Senate on February 19, 1929 (65-18); Passed the House on February 28, 1929 (284-90); Signed into law by President Calvin Coolidge on March 2, 1929

The Increased Penalties Act was a bill that increased the penalties for violating prohibition. Enacted on March 2, 1929, it is also called the "Jones–Stalker Act" or the "Jones Act". The legislation was sponsored by two Republicans, Sen. Wesley L. Jones of Washington and Rep. Gale H. Stalker of upstate New York State. It stipulated that wherever any penalty was prescribed for the illegal manufacture, sale, transportation, importation, or exportation of intoxicating liquor as defined in the Volstead Act of 1919, the penalty imposed for each such offense should be a fine not to exceed $10,000 or imprisonment not to exceed five years, or both. The Act did not repeal any minimum penalties then prescribed by law. It further declared that it was the intent of Congress that the courts, in sentencing offenders, "should discriminate between casual or slight violations and habitual sales of intoxicating liquor, or attempts to commercialize violations of the law."

Its purpose, as explained by Sen. Jones, was to stiffen the penalties against those convicted of violating Prohibition for commercial purposes. In particular, the Act increased the penalties for importing, transporting, and exporting liquor, to match the existing penalties for manufacturing and selling it. All five of these activities were expressly forbidden by the 18th Amendment, but the Volstead Act did not penalize importation or transportation as heavily as manufacture or sale.

The bill passed the Senate on February 19, 1929, by a vote of 65 to 18. On February 28 the House passed it by a vote of 284 to 90 (also reported as 283 to 90). President Calvin Coolidge signed the legislation on March 2, 1929.

The Jones Law affects primarily the punishment provision of the Volstead Law, and might as a matter of technique have been made an amendment thereof. Its legal consequences are very considerable, since it materially changes the substantive nature of liquor law violations, and the procedural problems of those charged with punishment thereof. Its influence will even be felt in the state courts. Finally, it vests in the judges of the federal courts a wide and very important discretion.

The Jones Law does not alone increase maximum penalties, it makes an important change in the classification. A judge sentencing a violator of the Volstead Act is now faced with the following admonition:

That wherever a penalty or penalties are prescribed in a criminal prosecution by the National Prohibition Act, as amended and supplemented, for the illegal manufacture, sale, transportation, importation, or exportation of intoxicating liquor, as defined by Section 1, Title II, of the National Prohibition Act, the penalty imposed for each such offense shall be a fine not to exceed $10,000 or imprisonment not to exceed five years, or both: Provided, That it is the intent of Congress that the court, in imposing sentence hereunder, should discriminate between casual or slight violations and habitual sales of intoxicating liquor, or attempts to commercialize violations of the law. "Sec. 2. This Act shall not repeal nor eliminate any minimum penalty for the first or any subsequent offense now provided by the said National Prohibition Act.
