= War Revenue Act of 1898 =

Legislation signed into law in the United States on June 13,1898

- 55th United States Congress

Congress
- Citation: 30 Stat. 448
- Enacted by: Congress
- Enacted: June 10, 1898
- Signed: June 13, 1898

Legislative history
- Bill title: H.R. 10100
- Introduced by: Nelson Dingley Jr. (R–ME)
- Introduced: April 25, 1898

Summary
- Enacted numerous taxes and authorized Treasury bond sales to fund the Spanish–American War

The War Revenue Act of 1898 was legislation signed into law in the United States on June 13, 1898, which created a wide range of taxes to raise revenue for the American prosecution of the Spanish–American War. The legislation established the predecessor to the estate tax, and twice the Supreme Court of the United States issued rulings about the law.

== History ==
The War Revenue Act of 1898 was introduced to fund American participation in the Spanish–American War. The people of Cuba had been seeking independence from Spain for several years, and after the destruction of the USS Maine (ACR-1) in Havana harbor on February 15, diplomatic relations between the U.S. and Spain dramatically worsened. President McKinley submitted a war message to Congress on April 11, and Congress enacted a joint resolution on April 19 demanding independence for Cuba and giving McKinley the authorization to declare war if Spain did not yield. McKinley signed the war resolution into law on April 20. After a series of events that included the announcement of a U.S. naval blockade of Cuba, the U.S. declared on April 25 that a state of war between the U.S. and Spain had existed since April 21.

Congress recognized from the outset that additional revenues would be needed to prosecute the war. On April 25, 1898, Representative Nelson Dingley, Jr. introduced H.R. 10100 to levy these new taxes. Dingley's bill proposed issuing $500 million in bonds and raising $100 million in taxes on products as diverse as chewing gum, beer, circuses, insurance policies, pawnbrokers, theaters, toilet articles, and wine. Democrats argued that these taxes fell too heavily on the poor, and sought to amend the law.

Dingley was chair of the powerful House Committee on Ways and Means, and his committee took up the bill the day following its introduction. The committee discussed the bill on April 26 and April 27, and reported it favorably to the House floor on April 27. The same day, the House debated and passed the bill.

H.R. 10100 was reported to the United States Senate, where it was referred to the Committee on Finance. The committee reported an amended bill to the Senate floor on May 12. Democrats and so-called "Silver Republicans" (members of the Republican Party who wished to devalue the dollar by moving the country off the gold standard to the silver standard) united to create a majority on the committee which adopted amendments adding excise taxes on business and taxing bond transactions.

The Finance Committee bill met with opposition on the Senate floor. The House bill sought to raise $150 million in taxes, and to borrow another $150 million (if necessary). But the Finance Committee bill raised $200 million in taxes and another $100 million via the issuance of United States Notes and silver certificates. Another Finance Committee change taxed all corporations at the same rate, without giving an exemption to small corporations. The issuance of Notes was stripped from the bill on the floor, but the issuance of certificates remained. An effort was made to exempt small businesses from the corporate tax, but this effort also failed. A wide range of amendments were offered on the Senate floor, including an antitrust law, an income tax, repeal of the United States Treasury's ability to issue bonds, and a number of restrictions on the issuance of bonds. All these failed. However, a limitation on the amount of silver coin which could be issued by the Treasury was adopted, the estate tax was lowered to 0.75 percent, and an excise tax on imported tea were all adopted. The Senate began debating the amended bill on May 16, and approved it on June 4.

Conference committees were established by both chambers, although the date when each was established is not clear, nor is it certain when the conference report was issued to the House and Senate. The House voted on the conference report on June 9, approving it by a vote of 154 to 107. The Senate adopted the conference report on June 10 by a vote of 43 to 22.

President McKinley signed the War Revenue Act into law on June 13.

== Terms ==
The War Revenue Act of 1898 authorized a tax on a wide range of goods and services, including amusements, liquor, tea, and tobacco, and required tax stamps on some business transactions (such as bills of lading, manifests, and marine insurance). The act also established a one-cent per call "telephone tax", which lasted three years.

A tax on corporate gross receipts over $200,000 was also included, but applied only to sugar- and oil-refining companies. The Supreme Court had struck down a gross corporate receipts tax in Pollock v. Farmers' Loan & Trust Company, 157 U.S. 429 (1895), because, as a direct tax, the gross receipts tax violated the Constitution's provision that direct taxes be apportioned. Opponents of the tax criticized it for not taxing partnerships, and Congress narrowed the scope of the tax to just sugar and oil companies.

The act also authorized the U.S. Treasury to issue $200 million in war bonds at 3 percent interest, provided that no more than $100 million in bonds were outstanding at any time. The government was also permitted to issue up to $100 million in bonds with a maturity of less than a year. This proved "a turning point" in the federal government's ability to create flexible financial instruments critical to maintaining the credit of the United States. There was concern that the Treasury could not find enough buyers for these bonds at such a low interest rate. But there were more than 230,000 buyers of bonds at amounts less than $500 and another 88,000 buyers of bonds at larger amounts. These bond sales and tax revenues generated budget surpluses that lasted through 1917.

Issuance of silver coinage continued until passage of the Gold Standard Act of March 14, 1900.

=== The estate tax ===
An estate tax was included in the War Revenue Act. This was not the first estate tax enacted in the history of the United States, but its graduated nature made it the precursor to the modern federal estate tax.

The estate tax was strongly opposed, but was never removed from the War Revenue Act. The 1898 tax was levied on estates themselves, not on beneficiaries. The tax varied from 0.75 percent to 15 percent, depending on the size of the estate and the relationship between decedent and legatee. Only personal property was subject to taxation, and the first $10,000 of the estate as well as property transferred from husband to surviving wife were exempted.

== Supreme Court decisions ==
The U.S. Supreme Court twice ruled on the provisions of the War Revenue Act.

In Nicol v. Ames, 173 U.S. 509 (1899) the Supreme Court held that the War Revenue Act's tax on stocks, bonds, securities, and commodities agreements was not a property tax, but was instead a tax on the right to exchange. Thus, the tax was more in the nature of an excise tax. The court also upheld the Act's applicability to livestock sales.

In the second case, the constitutionality of the estate tax was in question. The tax was upheld by the Supreme Court in Knowlton v. Moore, 178 U.S. 41 (1900).

== See also ==
- Timeline of the Spanish–American War
- Revenue stamps of the United States – Revenue taxes/stamps began paying for wars starting with the American Civil War.

== Bibliography ==
- Bank, Steven A. Anglo-American Corporate Taxation: Tracing the Common Roots of Divergent British and U.S. Approaches, 1799–2006. Cambridge, U.K.: Cambridge University Press, 2011.
- Garbade, Kenneth D. Birth of a Market: The U.S. Treasury Securities Market From the Great War to the Great Depression. Cambridge, Mass.: MIT Press, 2012.
- Goldstein, Joshua S. The Real Price of War: How You Pay for the War on Terror. New York: NYU Press, 2004.
- Jewell, Elizabeth. U.S. Presidents Factbook. New York: Random House Reference, 2005.
- Johnson, Barry W. and Eller, Martha Britton. "Federal Taxation of Inheritance and Wealth Transfers." In Inheritance and Wealth in America. Robert K. Miller, ed. New York: Plenum Press, 1998.
- Livington, James. Origins of the Federal Reserve System: Money, Class, and Corporate Capitalism, 1890–1913. Ithaca, N.Y.: Cornell University Press, 1989.
- MacCartney, Paul T. Power and Progress: American National Identity, the War of 1898, and the Rise of American Imperialism. Baton Rouge: Louisiana State University Press, 2006.
- McCulley, Richard T. Banks and Politics During the Progressive Era. New York: Routledge, 2012.
- Miller, Robert K. Inheritance and Wealth in America. New York: Plenum Press, 1998.
- New York Public Library. Bulletin of the New York Public Library. New York: New York Public Library, 1912.
- Pratt, Walter F. The Supreme Court Under Edward Douglass White, 1910–1921. Columbia, S.C.: University of South Carolina, 1999.
- Republican National Committee. Republican Text Book for the Campaign of 1898. Washington, D.C.: Republican National Committee, 1898.
- Shannon, Fred A. The Farmer's Last Frontier, Agriculture: 1860–1897. Armonk, N.Y.: M.E. Sharpe, 1973.
- Swaine, Robert T. The Cravath Firm and Its Predecessors, 1819–1947. Clark, N.J.: Lawbook Exchange, 2007.
- Trask, David F. The War With Spain in 1898. Lincoln, Neb.: University of Nebraska Press, 1996.
- Weisman, Steven R. The Great Tax Wars: Lincoln—Teddy Roosevelt—Wilson: How the Income Tax Transformed America. New York: Simon and Schuster, 2004.
