= Cullen–Harrison Act =

1933 U.S. legislation which legalized low-alcohol beer and wine

- Other short titles: Beer Permit Act; Permit and Tax Beer Act
- Long title: An Act to provide revenue by the taxation of certain nonintoxicating liquor, and for other purposes.
- Acronyms (colloquial): CHA
- Nicknames: Cullen–Harrison Act of 1933
- Enacted by: the 73rd United States Congress
- Effective: March 22, 1933

Citations
- Public law: Pub. L. 73–3
- Statutes at Large: 48 Stat. 16

Codification
- Titles amended: 27 U.S.C.: Intoxicating Liquors
- U.S.C. sections created: 27 U.S.C. ch. 2A § 64a et seq.

Legislative history
- Introduced in the House as H.R. 3341 by Thomas H. Cullen (D-NY) on March 14, 1933; Committee consideration by House Ways and Means, Senate Finance; Passed the House on March 14, 1933 (326–99); Passed the Senate on March 16, 1933 (53–37); Reported by the joint conference committee on March 20, 1933; agreed to by the Senate on March 20, 1933 (49–42) and by the House on March 21, 1933 (agreed); Signed into law by President Franklin D. Roosevelt on March 22, 1933

The Cullen–Harrison Act, named for its sponsors, Senator Pat Harrison and Representative Thomas H. Cullen, enacted by the United States Congress on March 21, 1933, and signed by President Franklin D. Roosevelt the following day, legalized the sale in the United States of beer with an alcohol content of 3.2% (by weight) and wine of similarly low alcohol content, thought to be too low to be intoxicating, effective April 7, 1933. Upon signing the legislation, Roosevelt made his famous remark, "I think this would be a good time for a beer."

According to the Cullen–Harrison Act, states had to pass their own similar legislation to legalize sale of the low alcohol beverages within their borders. Roosevelt had previously sent a short message to Congress requesting such a bill. Sale of even low alcohol beer had been illegal in the U.S. since Prohibition started in 1920 following the 1919 passage of the Volstead Act. Throngs gathered outside breweries and taverns to celebrate the return of 3.2 beer. The passage of the Cullen–Harrison Act is celebrated as National Beer Day every year on April 7 in the United States.

== See also ==
- Eighteenth Amendment to the United States Constitution
- Twenty-first Amendment to the United States Constitution
