= Revenue stamps of the United States =

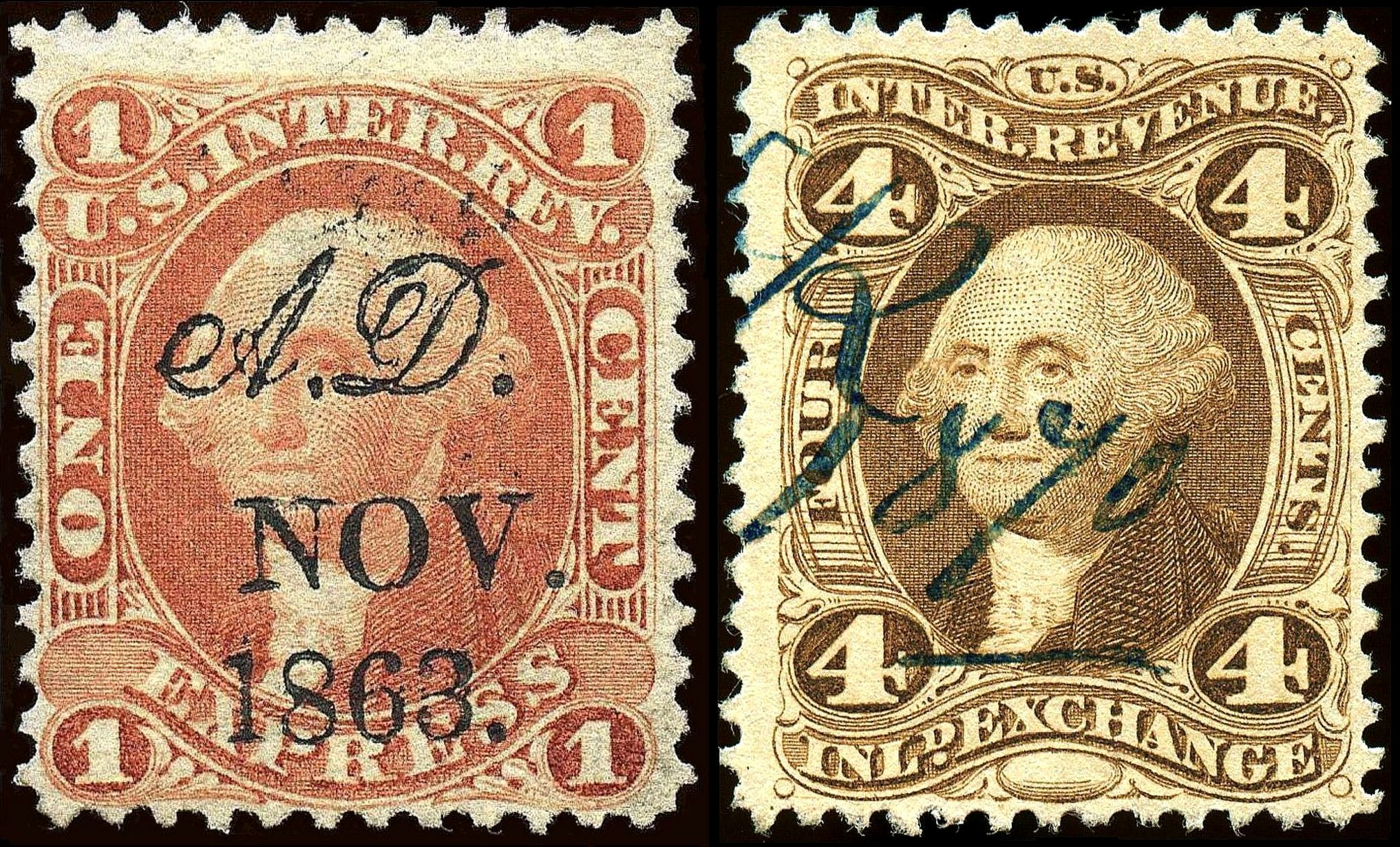
Examples of the first U.S. Revenue stamps issued in 1862

The first revenue stamps in the United States were used briefly during colonial times, among the most notable usage involved the Stamp Act. Long after independence, the first revenue stamps printed by the United States government were issued in the midst of the American Civil War, prompted by the urgent need to raise revenue to pay for the great costs it incurred. After the war ended however, revenue stamps and the taxes they represented still continued. Revenue stamps served to pay tax duties on items that came under two main categories, Proprietary and Documentary. Proprietary stamps paid tax duties on goods like alcohol and tobacco, and were also used for various services, while Documentary stamps paid duties on legal documents, mortgage deeds, stocks and a fair number of other legal dealings. Proprietary and Documentary stamps often bore these respective designations, while in several of the issues they shared the same designs, sometimes with minor variations. Beginning in 1862 the first revenue stamps were issued, and would continue to be used for another hundred years and more. For the first twelve years George Washington was the only subject featured on U.S. revenue stamps, when in 1875 an allegorical figure of Liberty finally appeared. Revenue stamps were printed in many varieties and denominations and are widely sought after by collectors and historians. Revenue stamps were finally discontinued on December 31, 1967.

== History of revenue stamp usage ==
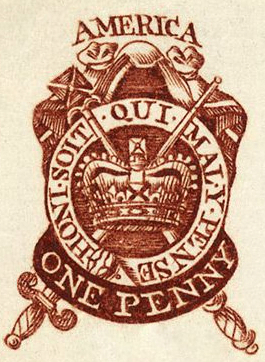
A proof copy of a stamp prepared for the 1765 Stamp Act

The first revenue stamps appeared in the years leading up to the American Revolution as a result of the 1765 Stamp Act, the taxes of which were not well received by the colonists of the day. These were the British colonial issues and required that many printed materials in the colonies be produced on specially prepared stamped paper produced in London which carried an embossed revenue stamp.

=== Civil War era, first issue ===
In August 1862, while the American Civil War was being waged, the United States (Union) government began taxing a variety of goods, services and legal dealings. To confirm that taxes were paid a 'revenue stamp' was purchased and affixed to the taxable item.

The Commissioner of Internal Revenue took bids for the printing and production of the first U.S. revenue stamps in an effort to raise revenue for the great costs of the war. The Department of Internal Revenue awarded Butler & Carpenter of Philadelphia the printing contract, paying it $19,080 to produce 106 printing plates, including the rolls, dies and all material necessary to maintain stamp production. Butler & Carpenter soon began producing the first revenue stamps, which were issued for use beginning Oct. 1, 1862.

For reasons unknown the bill from Butler & Carpenter was not settled by the U.S. government until some years later, after Butler and Carpenter wrote and appealed numerous times to the commissioner of Internal Revenue, Hon. J.J. Lewis, about the matter. Because of the long wait involved one of the major points of contention was the appreciable amount of increase in cost of materials between when the agreement was made and when the bill was finally settled.

The new stamps were printed in several colors and depicted a portrait of George Washington on all thirty denominations from one cent to $200. The engraved image of Washington was modeled after a painting by Gilbert Stuart. The first issues were printed on hard brittle paper, but later ones were printed on soft woven paper of varying thicknesses. Colors were generally dull for stamps printed before 1868. The stamps were issued in sheets with 12 gauge perforations or 'imperforate', meaning solid sheets with no perforations. Washington remained the only figure on the dozens of varieties issued up until 1874.

The new revenue stamps were used to pay tax on proprietary items such as playing cards, patent medicines and luxuries, and for various legal documents, stocks, transactions and legal services. The cancellation of these stamps was usually done in pen and ink, while hand stamped cancellations were seldom used. The end of the Civil War did not bring an end to revenue taxes, as the federal government still had $2.7 billion debt it had acquired. The government finally repealed the excise tax in 1883. Three distinct revenue stamp series were produced during the 21-year period.

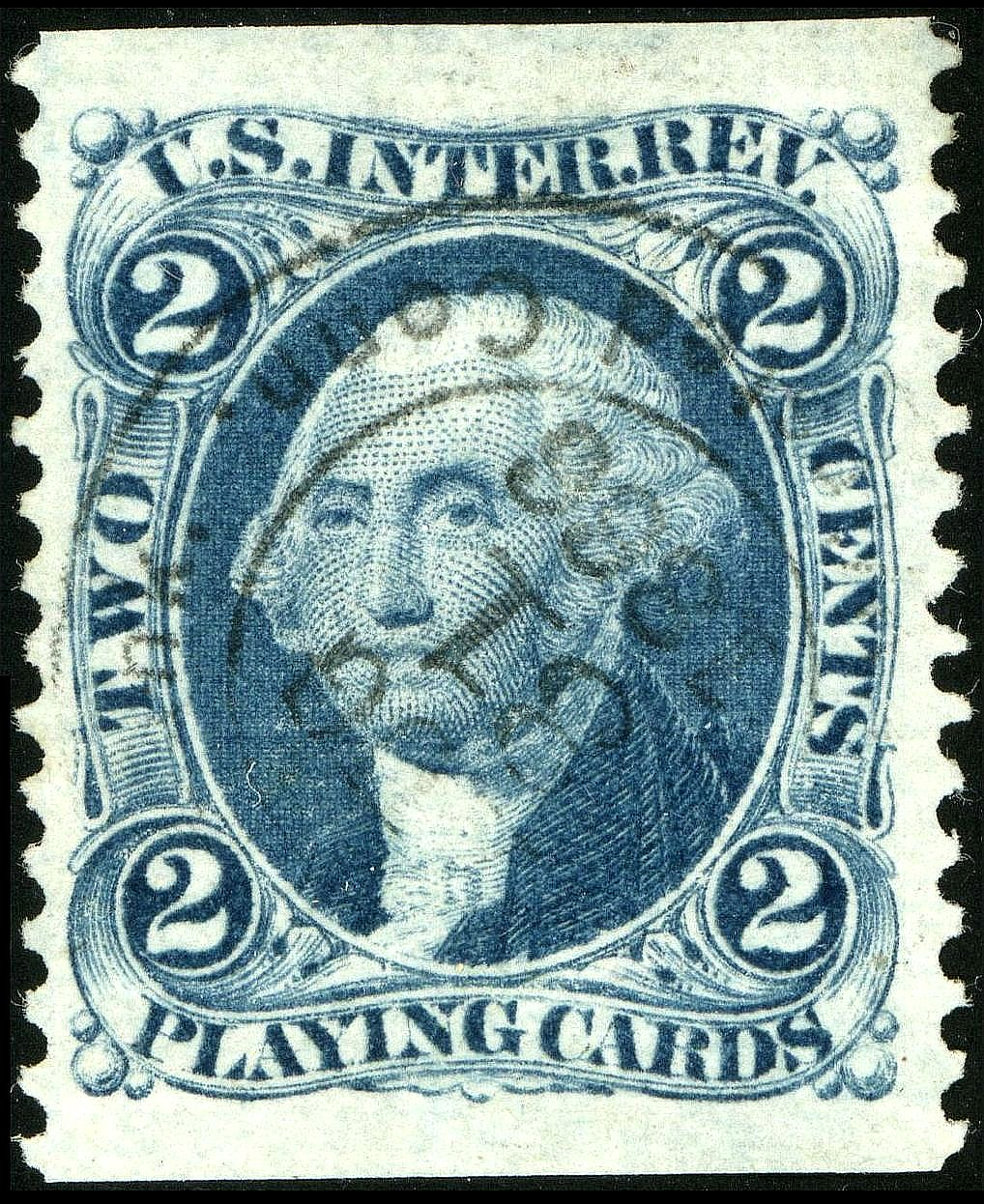
Playing card revenue stamps, often used for the photograph tax

Among the more notable instances of tax stamp usage occurred in the photography trade. As the Civil War progressed, the demand for photographs of family members, soldiers going off to war and returning war heroes increased dramatically, and the Federal government saw it as an opportunity to raise revenue to pay for the war. On August 1, 1864 the Internal Revenue department passed a 'photograph tax', which photographers had to pay on the sale of photographs. By 1864 there were no 'photography tax' stamps issued, so other stamps were substituted, typically, the proprietary or playing card revenue stamps was used. The stamps were usually affixed to the back of the photograph. Already burdened with high overhead costs and scarcity of materials because of the war, large photograph companies organized and petitioned Congress, complaining that they were shouldering too much of the tax burden. After exactly two years their constant efforts resulted in the tax being repealed on August 1, 1866. Several other widely used products, such as cotton, tobacco and alcohol, were also charged a proprietary tax, which generated appreciable revenues.

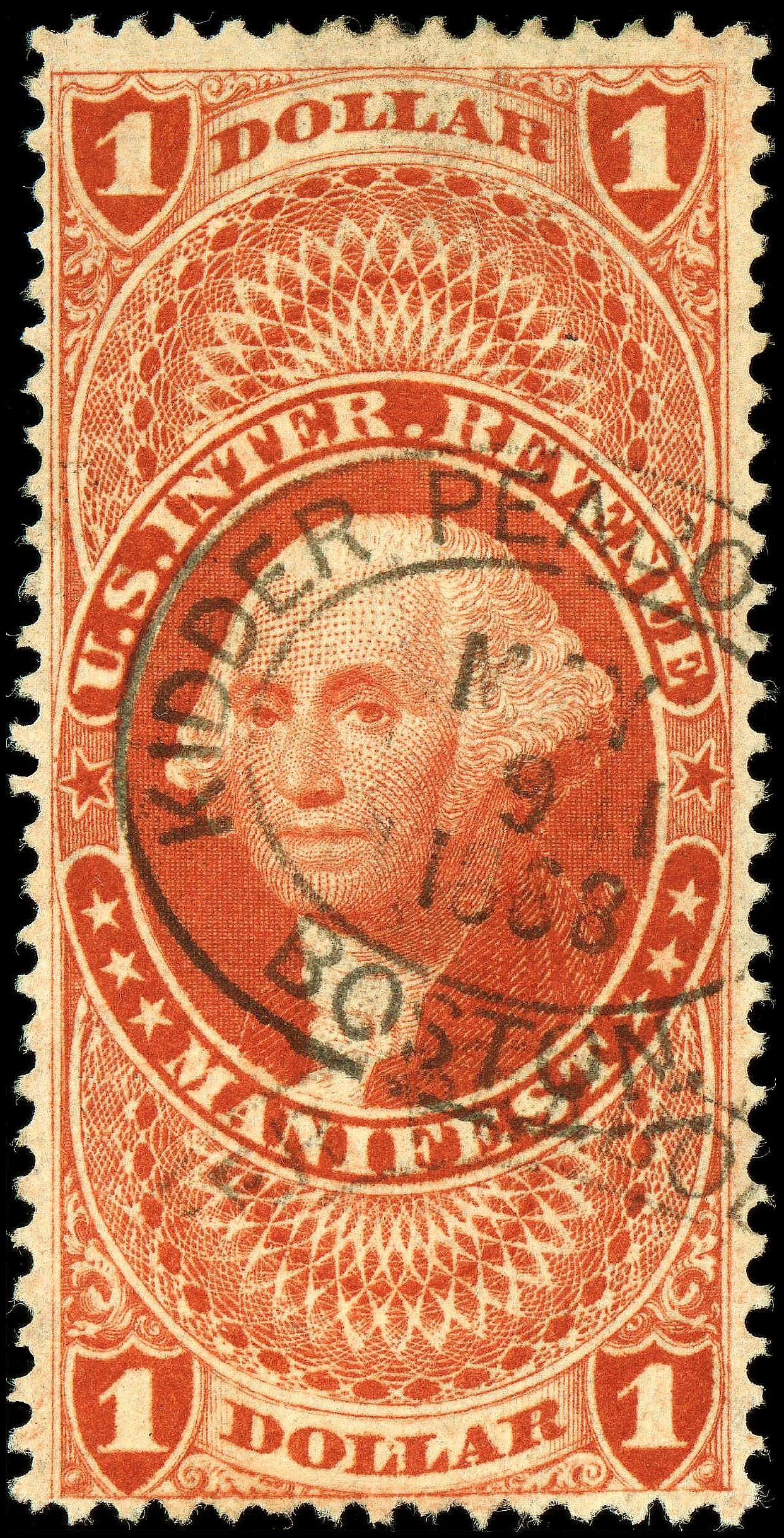

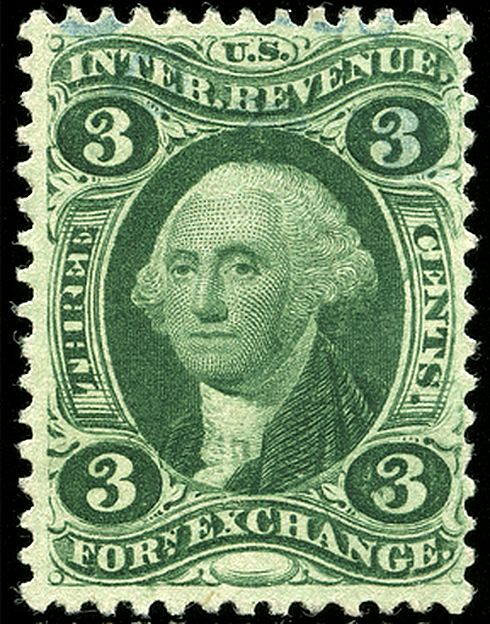
Foreign Exchange, 1862 issue

=== First issue design types ===
The first series of revenue stamps have two distinctive design types with each stamp designating the tax 'duty'. Designs for denominations 1-cent through 20-cents were simple, bearing a portrait of George Washington, while stamps with denominations 25-cents through 1-dollar are larger and have a more elaborate design and also designate the tax duty in a lower banner. Stamps with denominations of $1.30 were used to pay the tax duty for foreign exchange only, $1.50 for Inland exchange only while the stamps with denominations of $1.60 and $1.90 were for Foreign exchange only and oddly bear no duty designations in the stamp design. Denominations of 2-dollars through 10-dollars have tax duties designated in the lower circular banner surrounding Washington's portrait. Denominations of 15-dollars through 50-dollars have tax duties designated in the right side of the circular banner surrounding the portrait. The design used for the 1-cent denomination is unique and is not used for any other denomination.

Tax duties include
Agreement
Bank check
Bill of lading
Bond
Certificate
Charter party
Contract
Conveyance
Entry of goods
Foreign exchange
Inland exchange
Lease
Life insurance
Manifest
Mortgage
Passage ticket
Playing cards
Power of attorney
Probate of will
Proprietary
Surety bond

Various tax duties were only served by certain revenue stamps as some duties were only found on lower or higher denomination revenue stamps as the case may be. For example, revenue stamps with a designation for Playing cards occur only on denominations of 2, 3, 4, 5 and 6 cents, while the 25-cent denomination revenue stamp is the only one whose designation specifies Bond. A specialized stamp catalog is needed to see the different occurrences of tax-designation to denomination combinations.

=== Second issue ===
The second issue of revenue stamps were Documentary stamps and issued in 1871. After the Internal Revenue received many reports of the fraudulent re-use of revenue stamps, typically with cancellation ink washed or otherwise removed from the face of the stamp, a letter of May 31, 1867 from government officials in Wall Street was sent to Internal Revenue commissioner E.A. Rollins expressing the concern that "The U.S. government loses thousands of dollars daily by stamps being used a second time." The ordinary stamps in use at this time did not receive the cancellation ink very well, unless it was heavily applied. The letter advised that all stamps be printed in a pale yellow color. This particular suggestion however was not taken up by Butler & Carpenter, but instead, after a period of experimentation, they responded to the problem by producing stamps of a lighter shade and on a paper that more readily absorbed cancellation ink. The Internal revenue was frequently sending stamps suspected of having cancellation ink washed to the engravers and printers for inspection to determine if they had been tampered with.

The new paper was finally employed in stamp production in early 1869 and by 1871 a second series of stamps was issued, printed on a special patented "chameleon" paper containing silk fibers which can be seen in the paper with the naked eye. Still produced by Butler & Carpenter of Philadelphia, the entire second series, with the exception of the 200-dollar issue, were printed in the same bi-color combination, with the portrait of Washington printed in black and with the frame work in blue with various ornate and elaborate designs, popular during that period.

"Persian rug" stamps

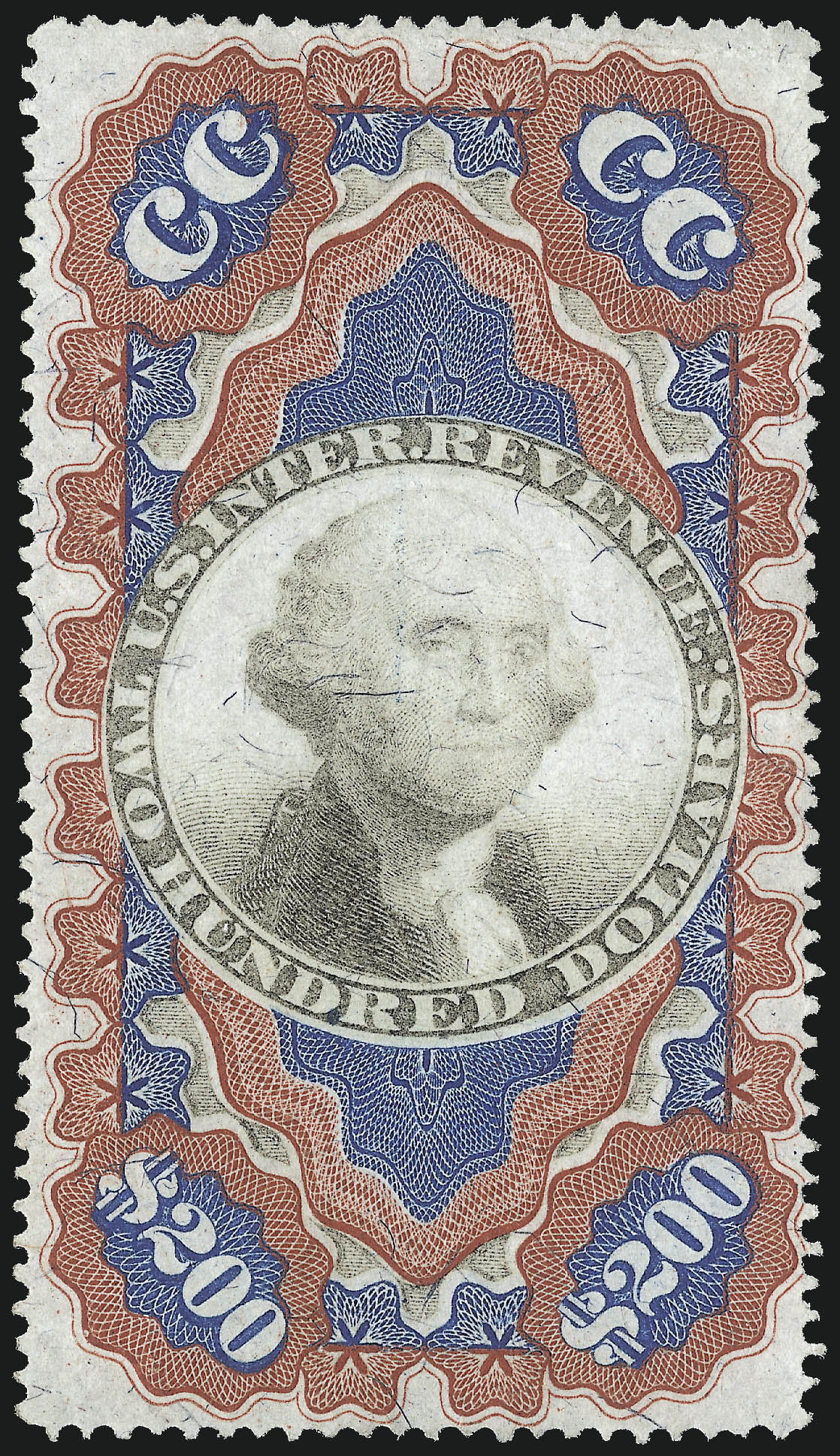
"Small Persian rug", $200

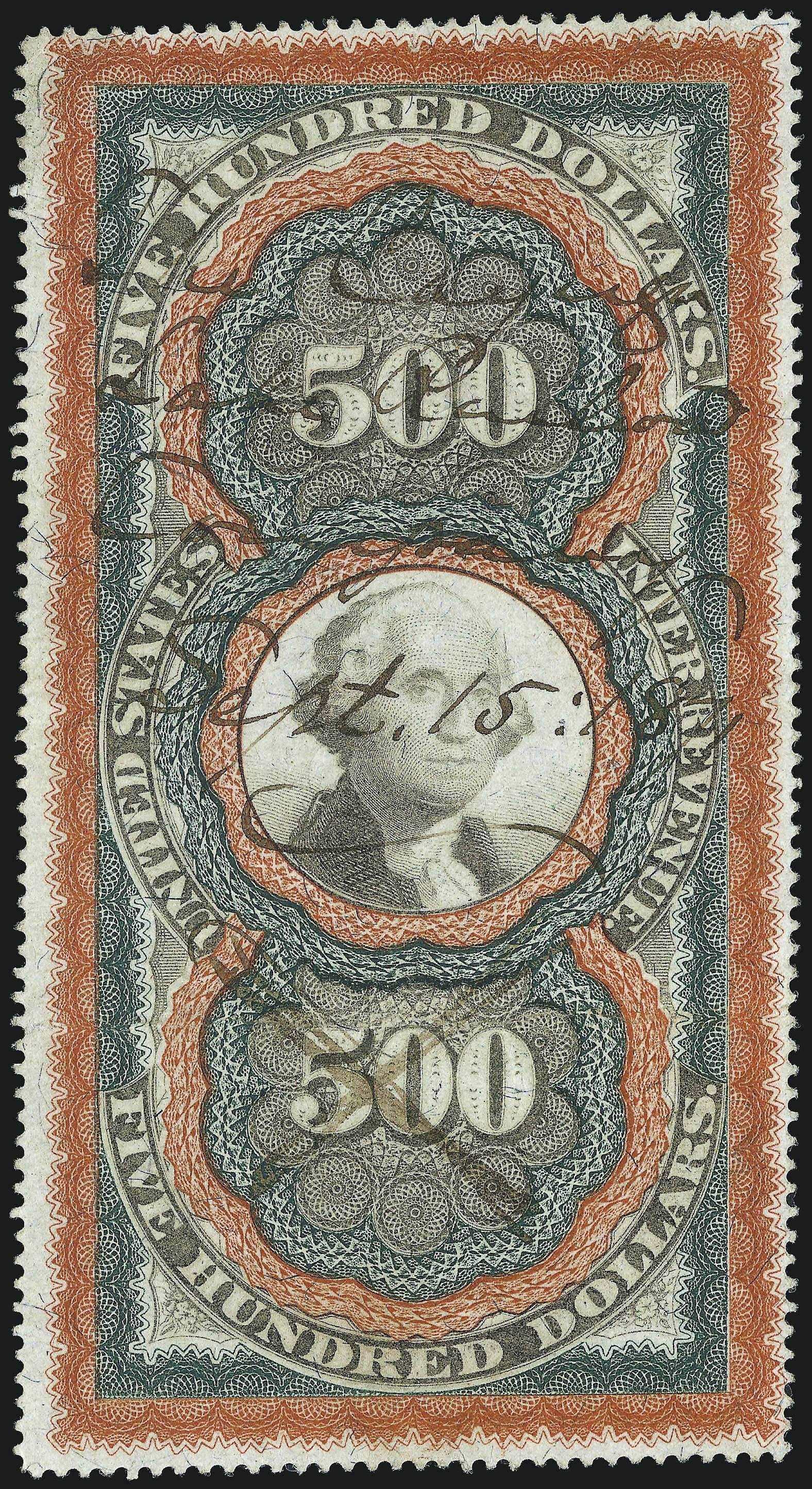
"Large Persian rug", $500

The highest values in the second issue of revenue stamps are 200-dollar (left) and the 500-dollar (right) stamps and are commonly referred to by collectors as the Small and Large Persian rug revenue stamps respectively, which are considered by many to be among the most colorful and elaborately engraved stamps in all of philately. Both the 200 and 500-dollar stamps were printed in very limited quantities. The 200-dollar small Persian Rug had a printing of 446 copies, with approximately 125 known surviving examples. The stamps were printed one to a 'sheet', with margins on all four sides with inscriptions on the two side margins. The only surviving full sheet of the small Persian rug, was used to pay tax duties on the will of Erastus Corning, Sr. in 1872. The 500-dollar large Persian rug is indeed larger, measuring 2 1/8 by 4 inches with only 204 stamps of this denomination ever issued. Because of their relatively large sizes and the subsequent large number of perforations on each stamp, and the fact that they were used on documents which were typically folded across the stamps, most examples exist with some sort of flaw(s) about the stamp paper. Printed by the Carpenter Printing company of Philadelphia, a 5,000-dollar design was also proposed and a trial color essay was printed, but it was never issued for revenue use so there only exists a die proof.

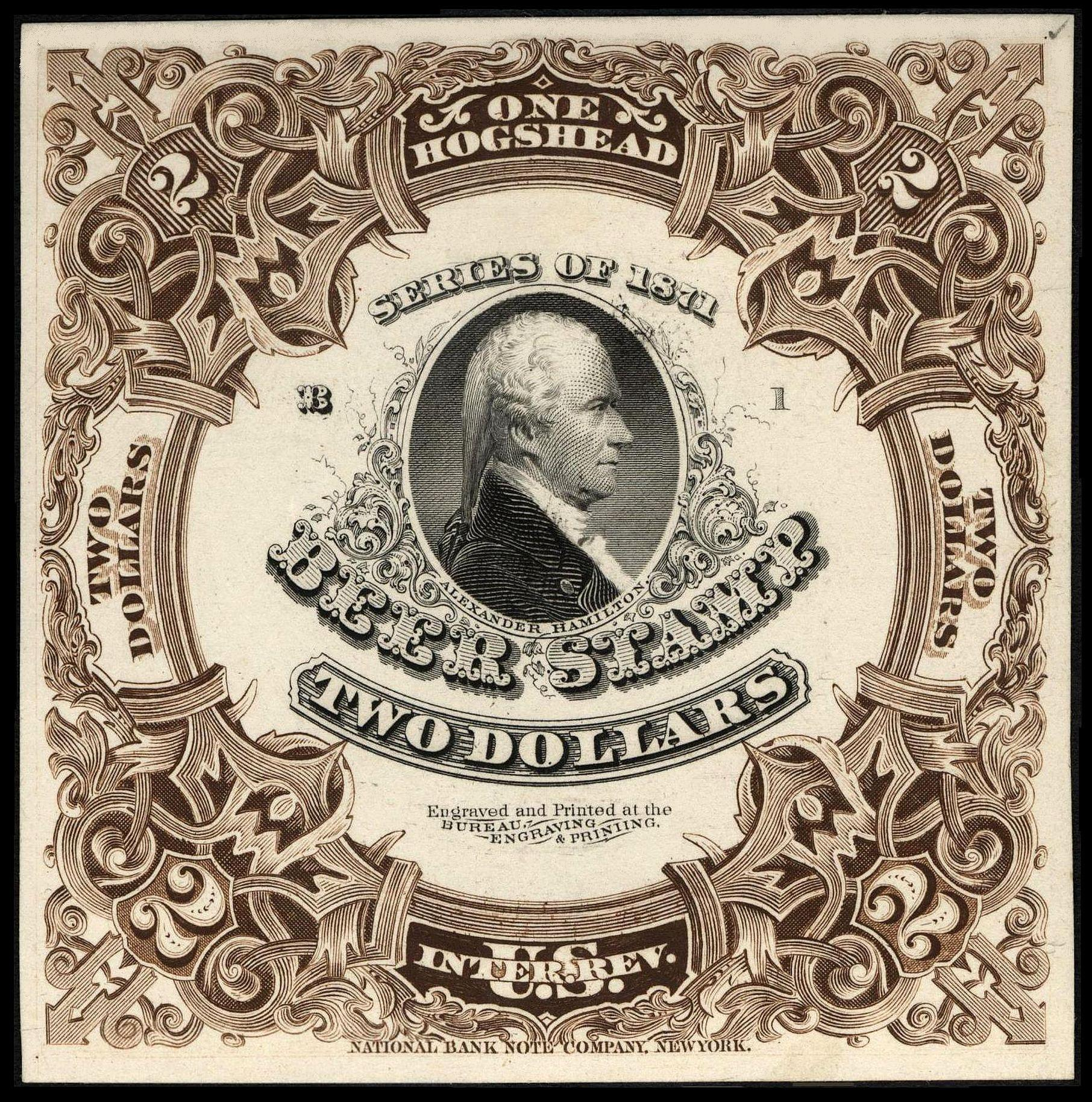
Alexander Hamilton beer stamp issue of 1871

=== Alcohol revenue stamps ===
Taxes were commonly levied on alcohol and tobacco products and a variety of such stamps were printed for this purpose. Typically, the stamp would be affixed to a given product when the taxes were paid in such a way as to seal a given container, where upon opening, the stamp would be damaged. For example, revenue stamps for beer tax were issued to brewers in sheet form, where an individual stamp was cut from it and used as a seal over the opening in a barrel of beer. To access the beer the stamp would have to be punctured, thus prohibiting its reuse.

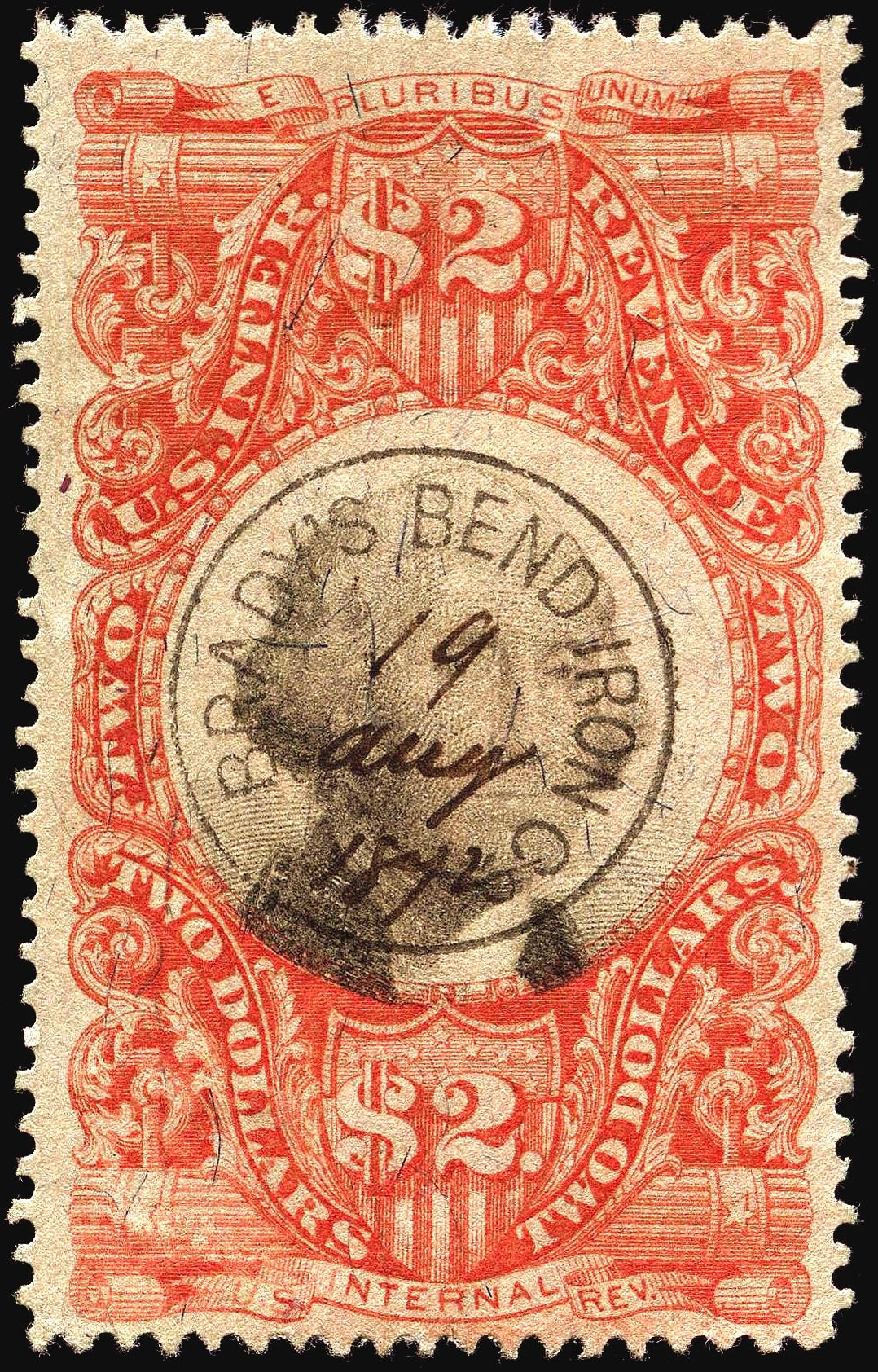

=== Third issue ===
Because the second issue of revenue stamps were all printed in the same blue and black colors they were often difficult to distinguish at a glance by Internal Revenue employees. Subsequently, a third issue of stamps with similar designs and some variations as the second issue but with distinctive colors assigned to the various denominations was released between 1871 and 1872. Production of the third issue employed many of the same printing plates, engraved by J.R. Carpenter of Philadelphia, and were printed on the same special "chameleon" paper with silk fibers used in the printing of the second issue, with perf' 12 perforations. Unlike many of the stamps in the second issue, the third issue does not designate any duty type in the stamp designs. Double transfers and inverted centers occur in nearly all the different denomination designs.

By 1875 the Internal Revenue awarded the contract to print for revenue stamps to the National Bank Note Company who prepared a second series of proprietary stamps. The new revenue stamps are commonly referred to as the "second proprietary issue," and occur in 1-cent, 2-cent, 3-cent, 4-cent, 5-cent, and 6-cent denominations. Use of revenue stamps to pay proprietary taxes ended on July 1, 1883.

== Liberty issue of 1875 ==
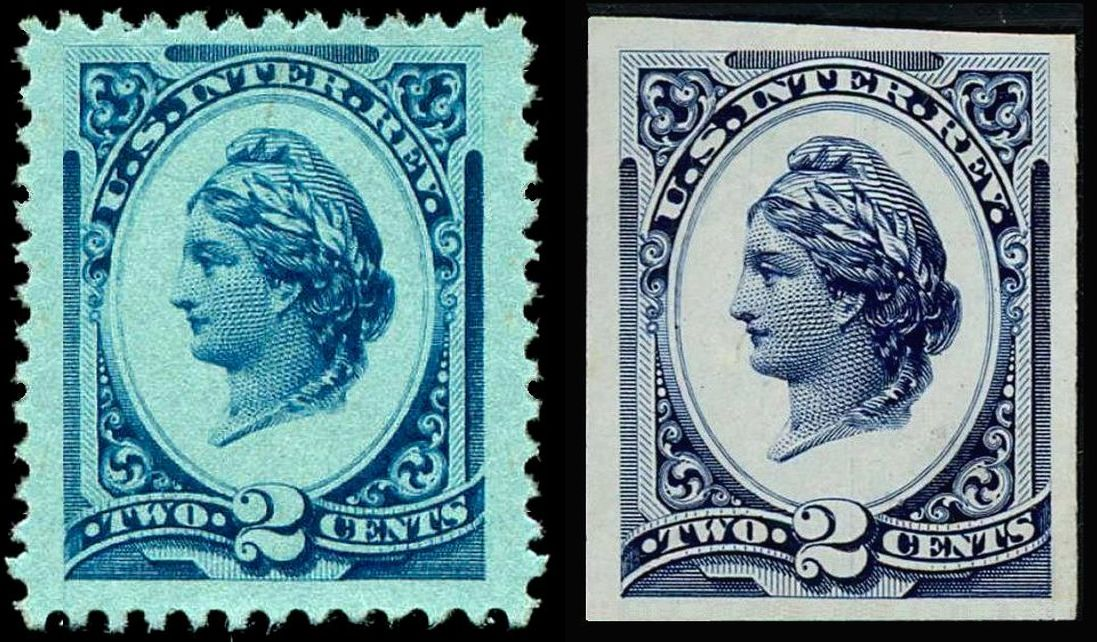
Liberty revenue, 2c, 1875 issue stamp (at left) and plate proof

In 1875, the Internal revenue department issued a 2-cent revenue, depicting an allegory of Liberty. Printing of this issue continued into 1878. This was the first U.S. Revenue stamp to be issued that did not bear the portrait of George Washington. The Liberty issue was printed on silk bluish paper. Two types of perforations were added, standard perforations with punctured holes, and rouletted. Stamps produced in 1878 were printed on double-lined watermarked paper. Quantities printed for this issue were great, totaling 228,351,689 stamps, which include both standard and rouletted perforations. The quantities of stamps issued with each type of perforation are not known.

== Overprints of 1898 ==
On June 13, 1898, Congress passed the War Revenue Act of 1898 to provide badly needed funding for the Spanish–American War. The law was to become effective on July 1, 1898, leaving only seventeen days to produce the revenue stamps. In anticipation of the law's passage the Bureau of Engraving and Printing had already commenced work on the dies and printing plates for the new revenue stamps, however they were unable to issue the stamps when the law went into effect. To meet the demand for revenue stamps, existing stocks of standard postage stamps (issued in 1895–1898) were overprinted with the initials I.R. (i.e., Internal Revenue) for use as revenue stamps. Initials are faint on issues with denominations of 8, 10 and 15-cents.

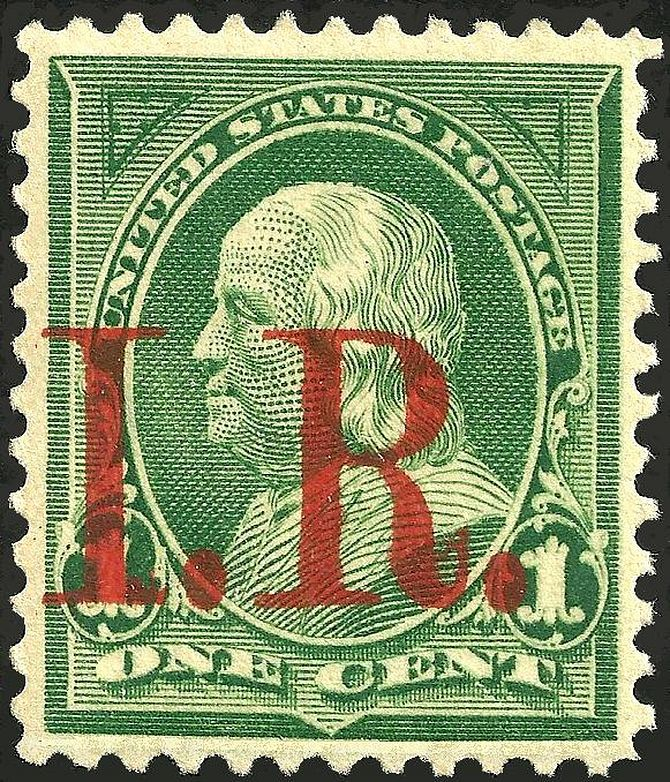
Franklin overprint 1c, 1898 issue

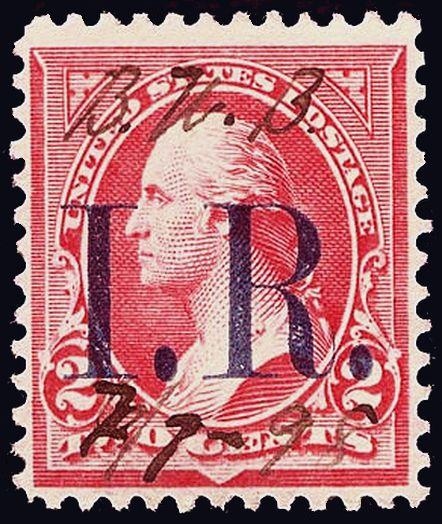
Washington overprint, 2c, 1898 issue

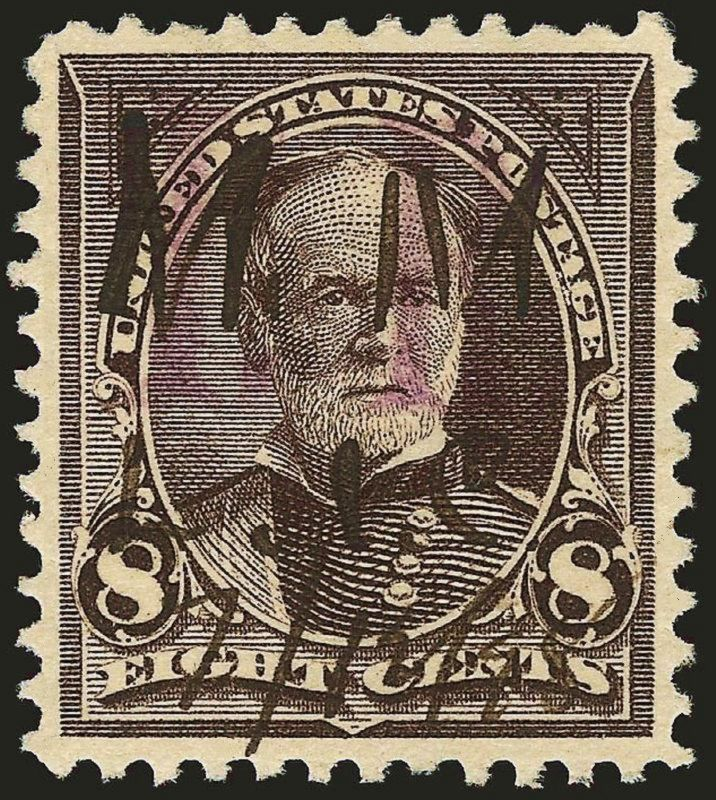
Sherman overprint, 15c, 1895 issue

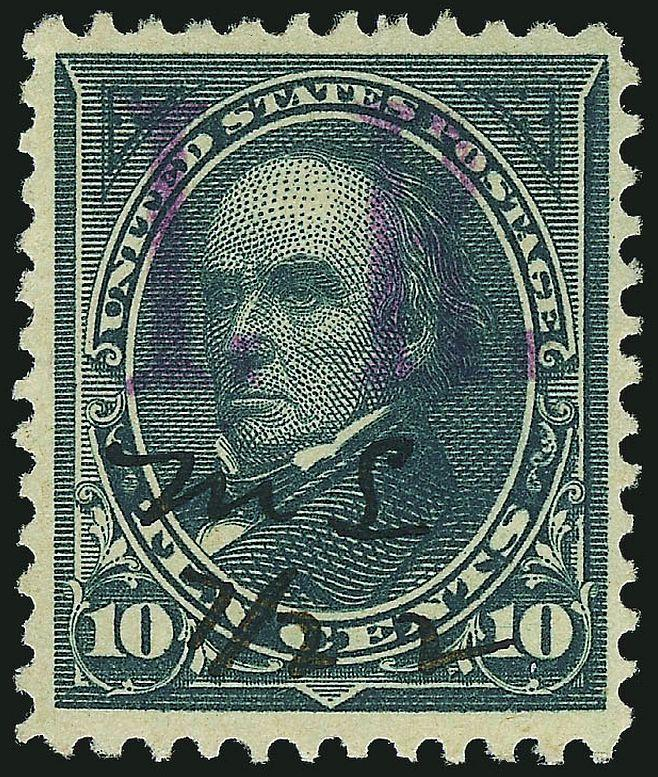
Webster overprint, 10c, 1898 issue

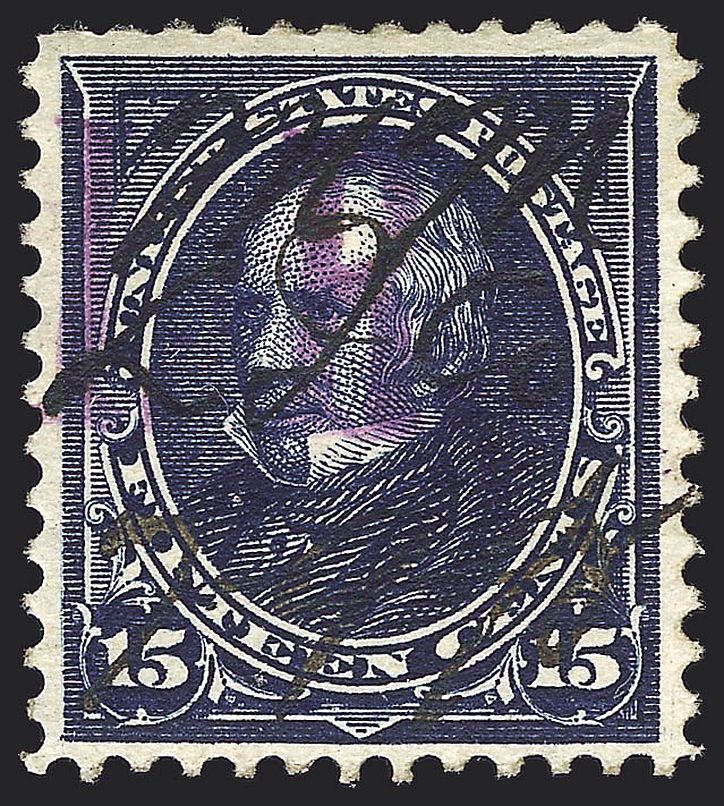
Clay overprint, 15c, 1898 issue

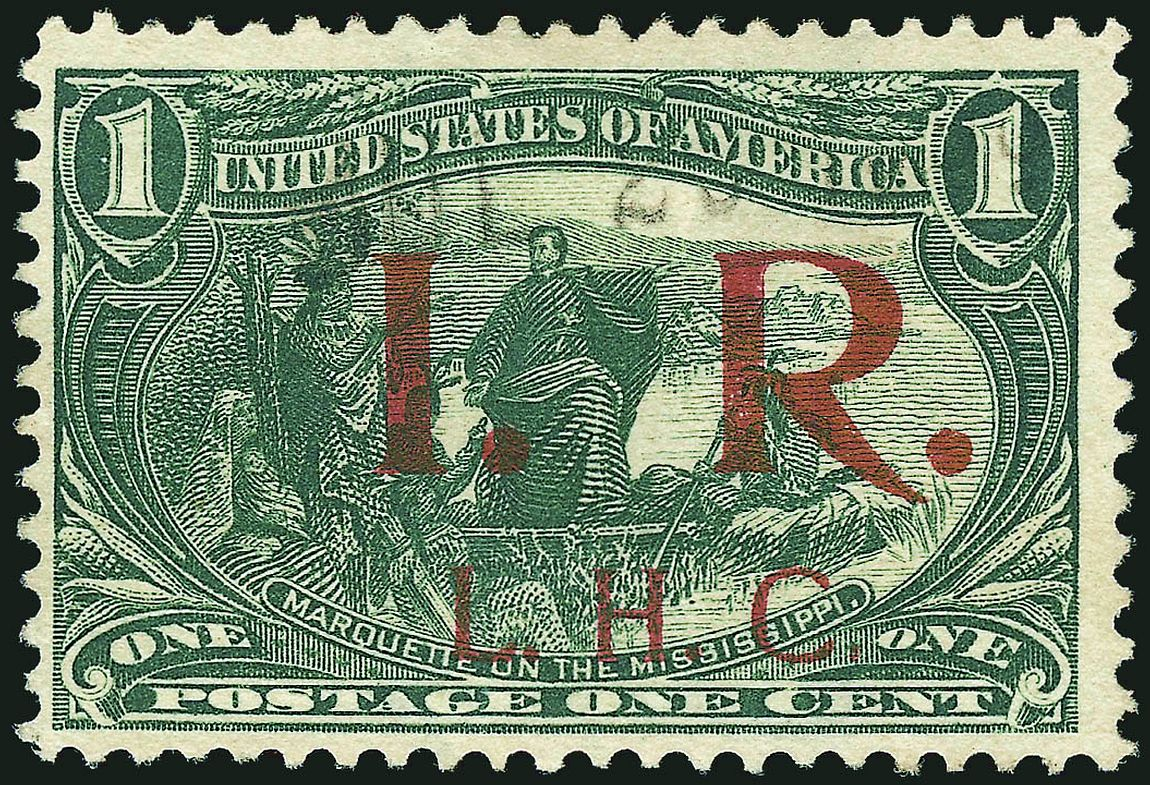
Trans-Mississippi issue overprinted IR

Because of shortages of revenue stamps two shipping firms operating along the Erie Canal used the existing 1c Trans-Mississippi stamp issue which was approved by the Federal District Revenue Collector who commissioned the Purvis Printing Company to do the overprinting. They were ordered by L. H. Chapman of the Chapman Steamboat Line, which operated freight-carrying steamboats along the Erie Canal, making stops at Syracuse, Utica, Little Falls and Fort Plain. Only 250 stamps were produced. In addition 250 were printed reading "I.R./P.I.D. & Son", for P.I. Daprix & Son, which served different ports along the same waterway. In each case five panes of 50 stamps were overprinted with the initials I.R..

== Issues of 1898 ==
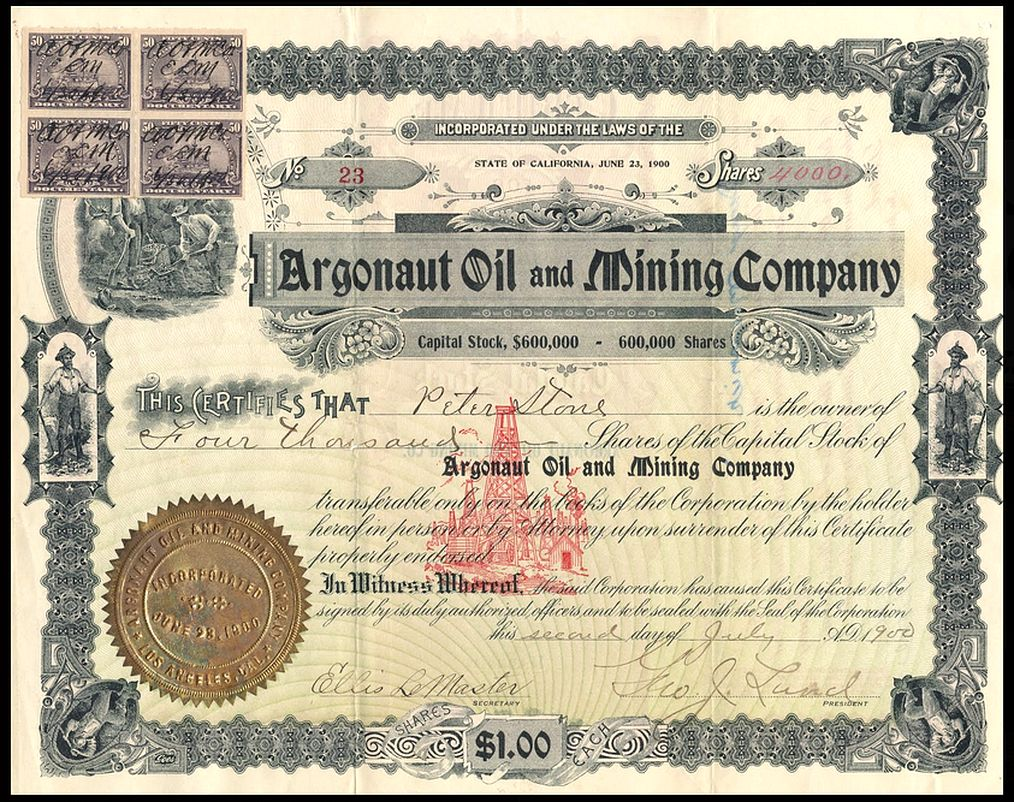
Common use of Documentary Revenue stamps (upper left) affixed to stock certificate

In the continuation of providing funding for the Spanish–American War Congress authorized a tax on a wide range of goods and services including various alcohol and tobacco products, tea and other amusements and also on various legal and business transactions (such as Stock certificates, bills of lading, manifests, and marine insurance). To pay these tax duties revenue tax stamps were purchased and affixed to the taxable item or respective certificate. There are seventeen stamps in this issue which occur in denominations ranging from ½-cent to 50-dollars which were printed on double lined watermarked paper. Two types of perforations were used: Rouletted perforations and 'hyphen' shaped perforations. Numerous double transfers occur (doubled image) in this issue.

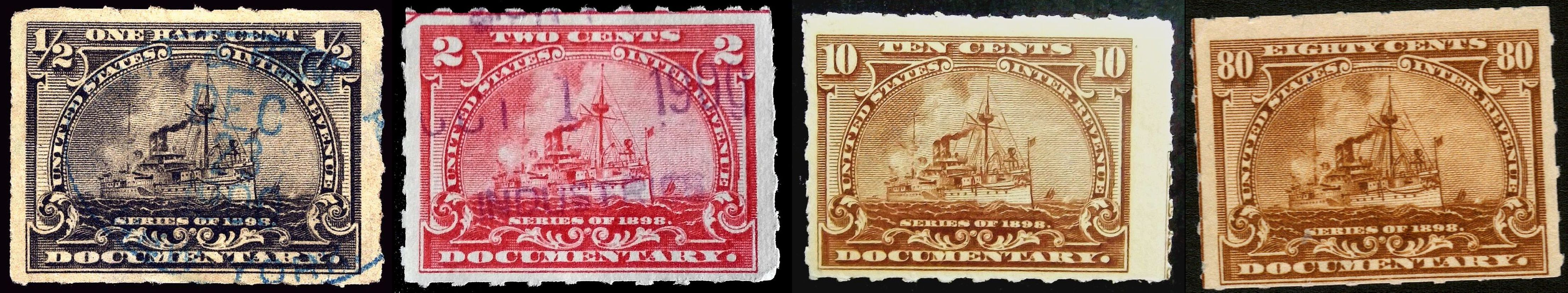
Selection of U.S. Documentary Revenue stamps of 1898 Stamps depict the image of the USS Maine

- Issues occur with denominations from 1/2-cent to 80-cents depict a battleship

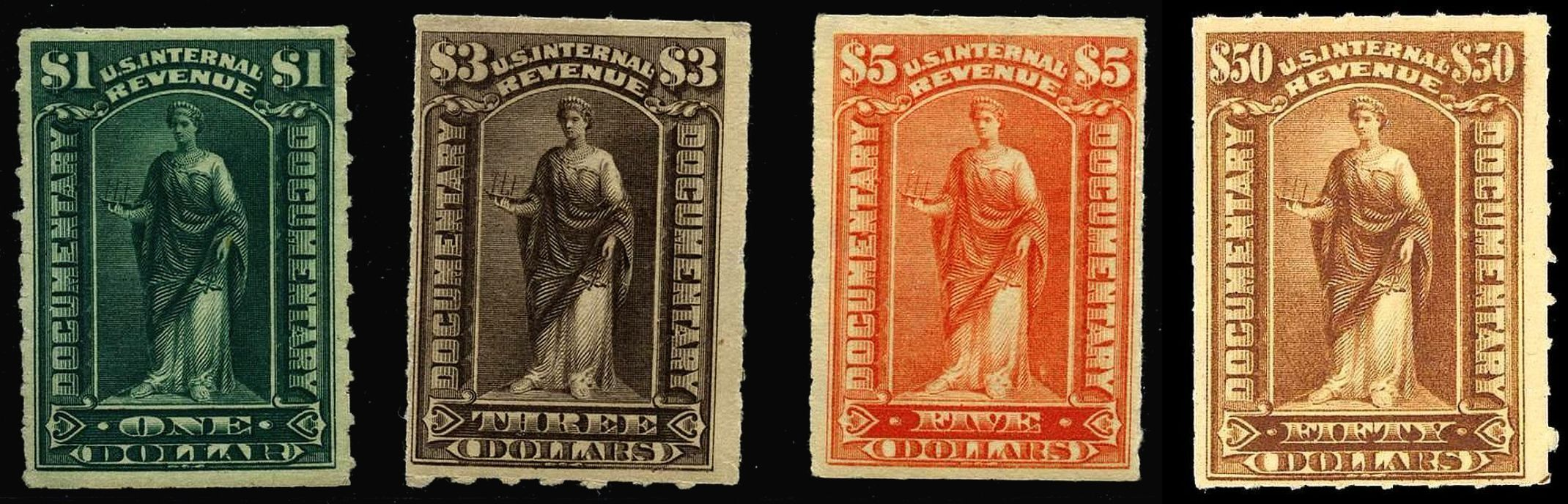
Selection of U.S. Documentary revenue stamps from the 1898 issue

- Issues occur with denominations from 1-dollar to 50-dollars depicting a standing allegorical figure of Commerce. Design is modification of one used in Newspapers periodicals of 1875 and 1895. A second printing was issued in 1900 with a large numeral 1 overprint, occurring in two types -- solid numeral and ornate numeral.

== Documentary series of 1898 ==
The three Documentary stamps issued in the 1898 series (which were actually issued in 1899) feature the portraits of John Marshall, Alexander Hamilton and James Madison, each bearing the inscription Series of 1898. These three designs were also used in the 1914, 1917 printings and much later in 1940 issues, with slight modifications in the design. i.e.The inscription Series of 1898 was removed. As an added security measure each of these high value stamps was given its own unique serial number. Produced by the Bureau of Engraving and Printing the issues of 1898 were printed on white wove paper and watermarked with the initials U.S.I.R. (i.e. United States Internal revenue) in block capital letters. The stamps were separated by rouletted perforations. The issues of 1917 and 1940 were also printed on double lined watermarked paper with standard gauge 12 perforations.

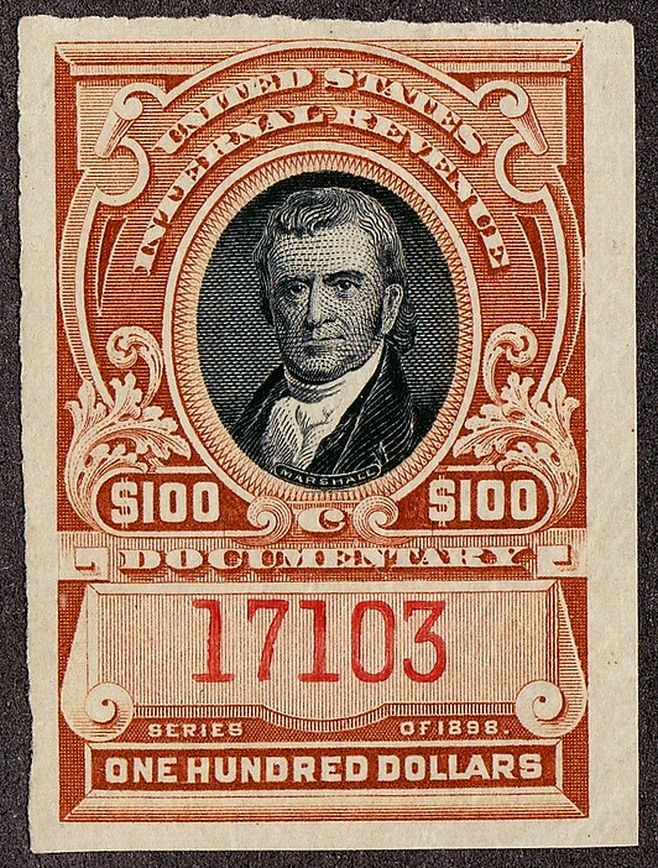
Marshall revenue, $100 1899 issue

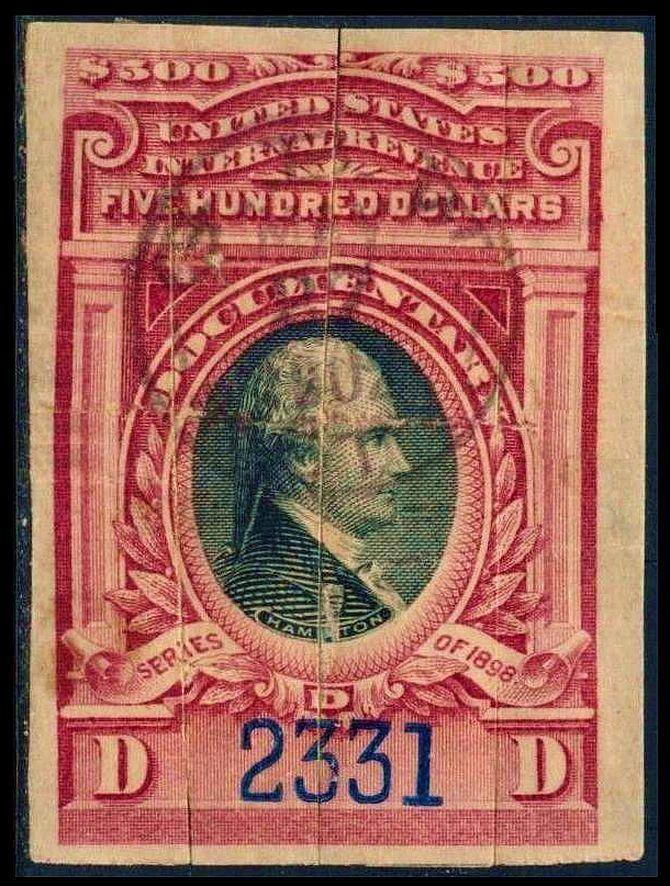
Hamilton revenue, $500 1899 issue

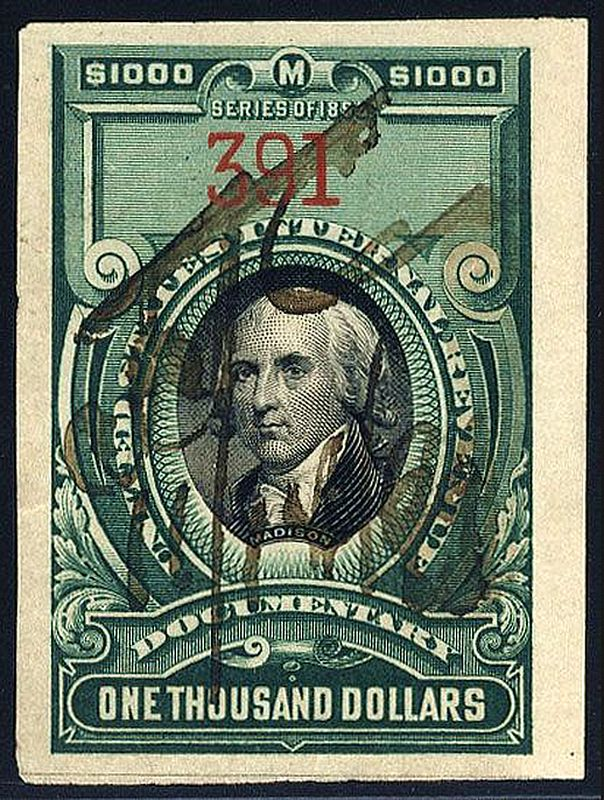
Madison revenue, $1000 1899 issue

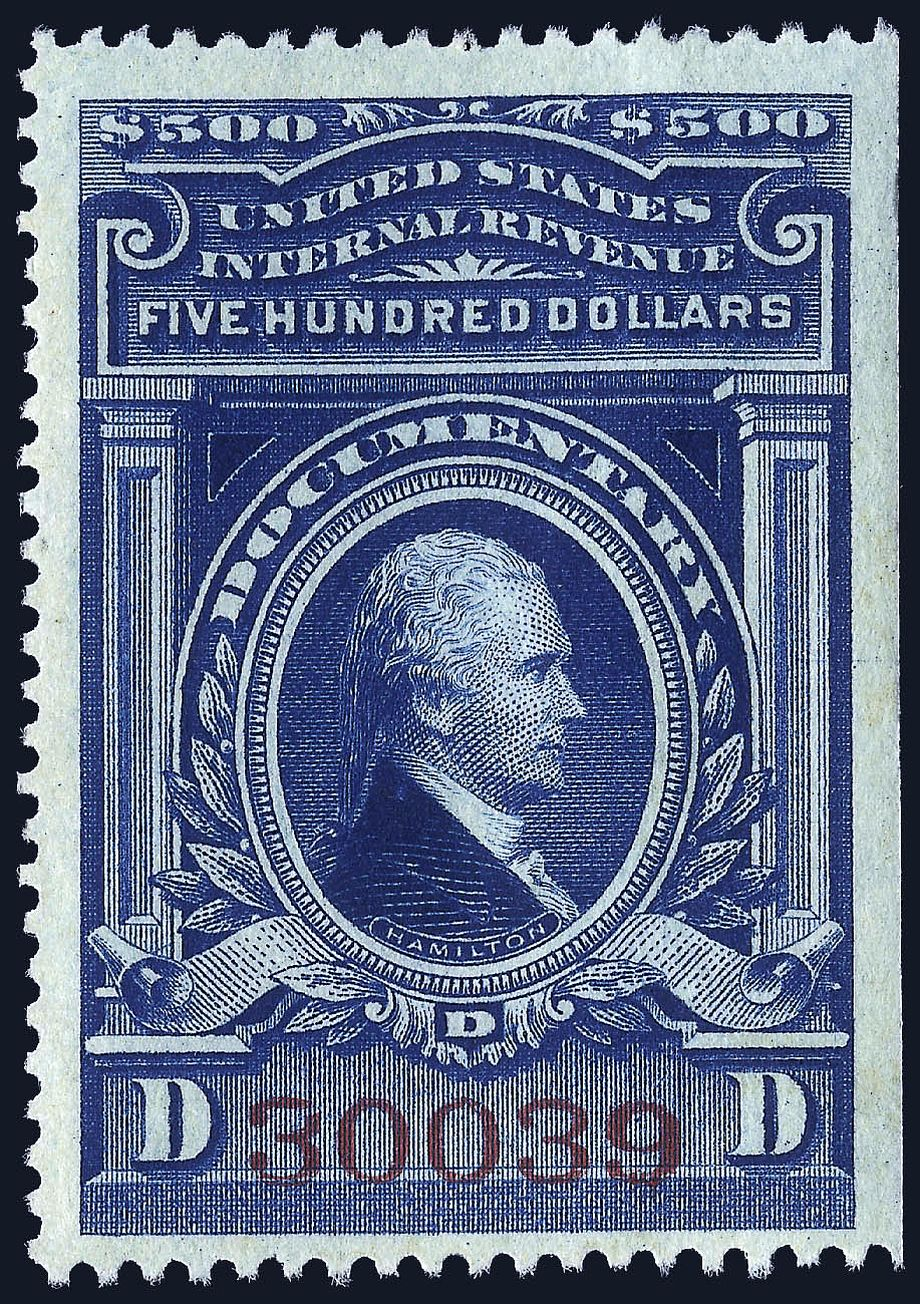
Hamilton revenue $500 1917 issue

== Issues of 1914 ==
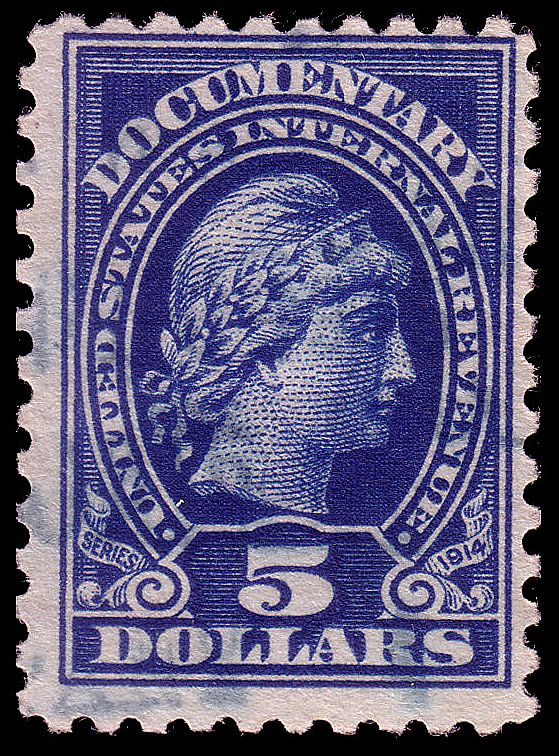
Liberty revenue, $5 1914 issue

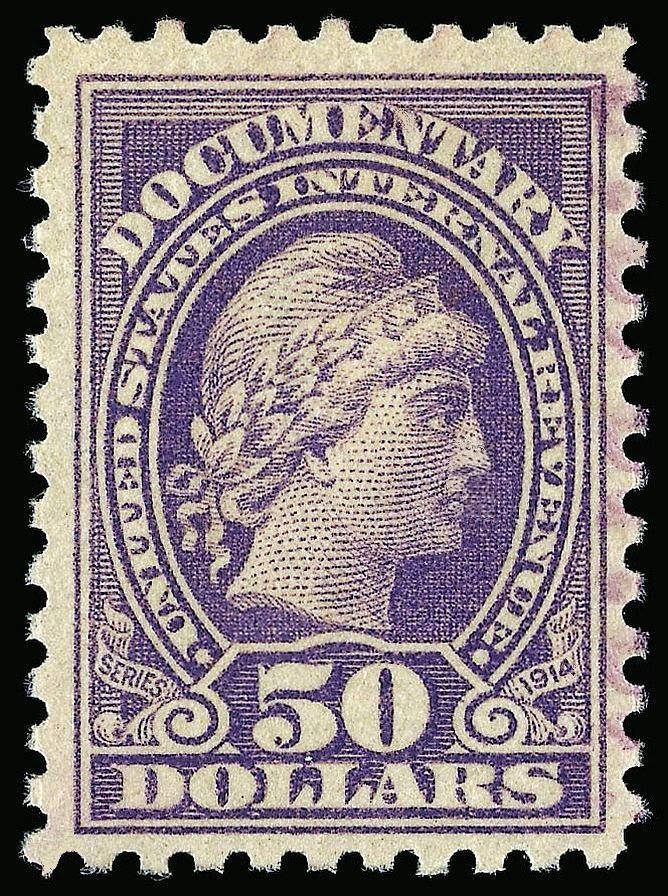
Liberty revenue, $50 1914 issue

Issues of 1914 were printed in two basic design types. Lower denominations (½-cent through 80-cents) printed with denomination encircled; Higher denominations (1-dollar through 50-dollars) printed with allegory of freedom in profile. Denominations from ½-cent to 80-cents were printed on both single line and double lined watermarked paper, while higher denominations were printed on double lined watermarked paper only.

== Issues of 1917–1933 ==
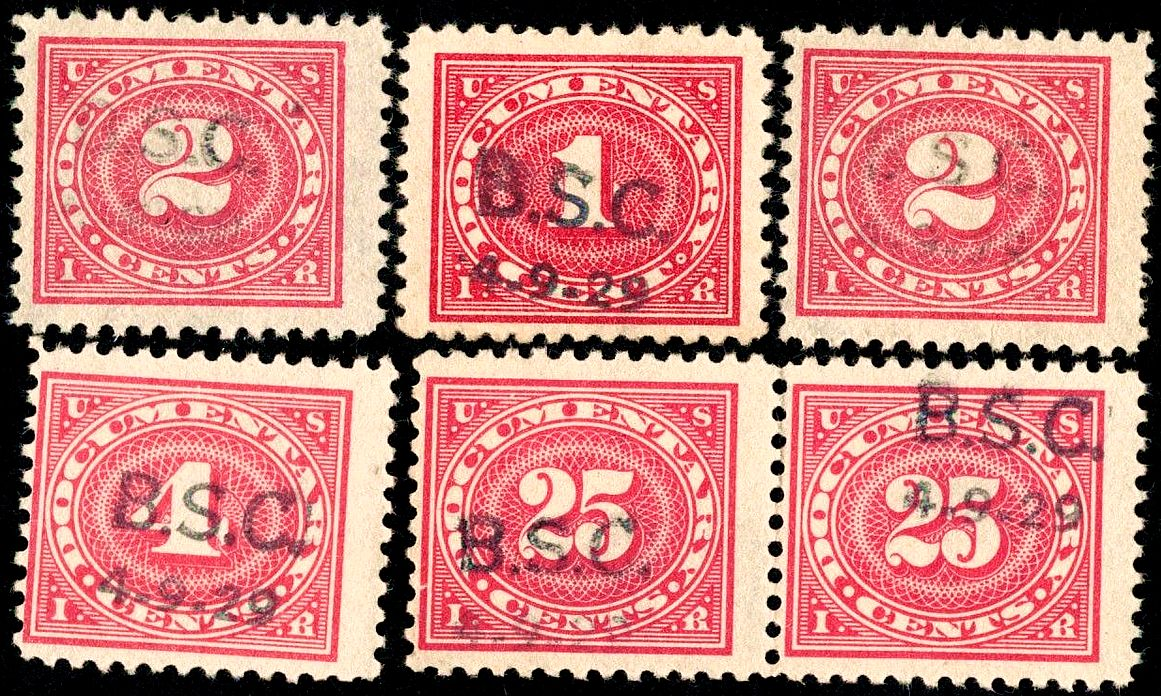
1917 issues

Lower denominations range from 1-cent to 80-cents; Higher denominations range from 1-dollar to 1,000-dollars. Printed on single line watermarked paper, with gauge 10 perforations.

== Issues of the 1940s and 1950s ==
During the period from 1940 to 1958 the Department of Internal Revenue released several hundred, Documentary, revenue stamps in three basic designs with denominations that ranged from 1-cent to 10,000-dollars and with a variety of different portraits of notable statesmen, each denomination of stamp bearing a different portrait. Almost all of the issues of this period were printed in "carmine" red. The higher denominations of 30-dollars to 10,000-dollars bore a unique serial number as an added security measure. A few reprints from 1917 were also issued during this period.

Three design types : Design at left used for denominations 1-cent to 80-cents; Center, 1-dollar to 20-dollars; Right, 30-dollars to 10,000-dollars, with serial numbers.

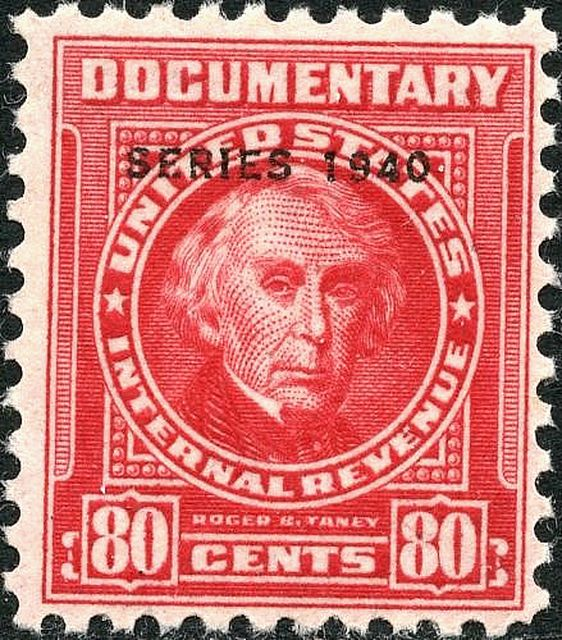
Taney revenue 80c 1940 issue

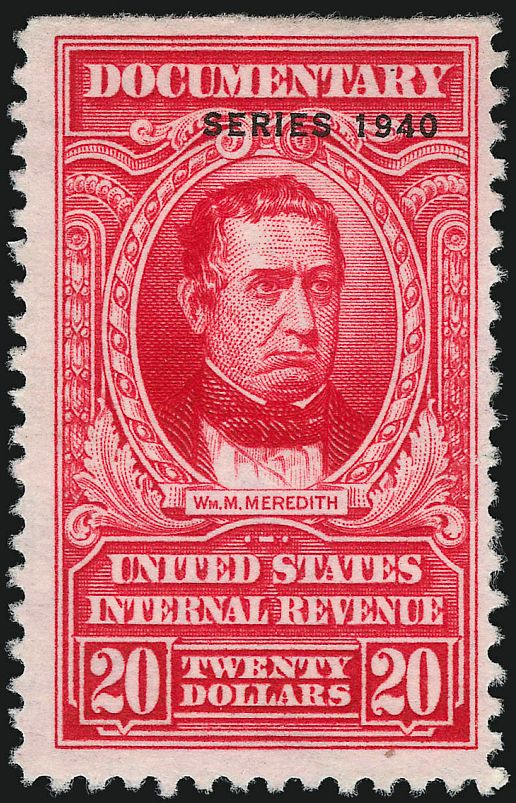
Meredith revenue $20 1940 issue

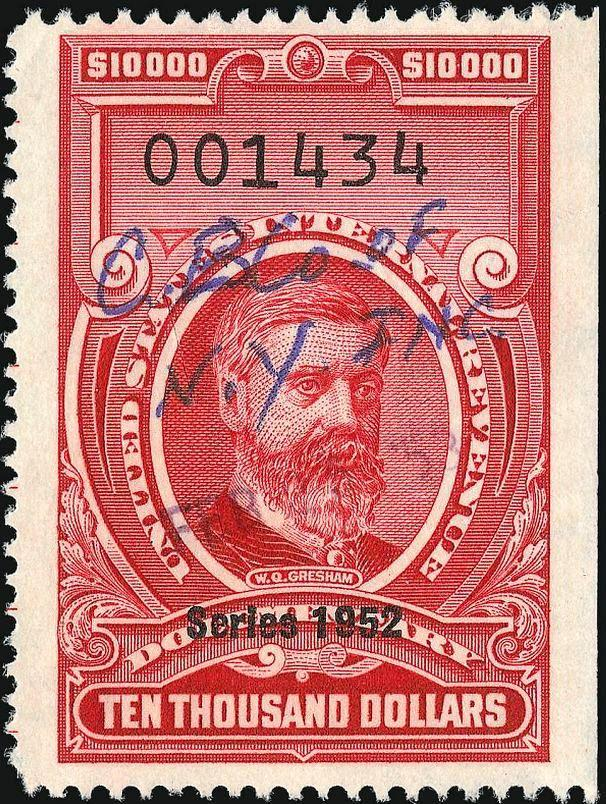
Gresham revenue $10,000 1952 issue

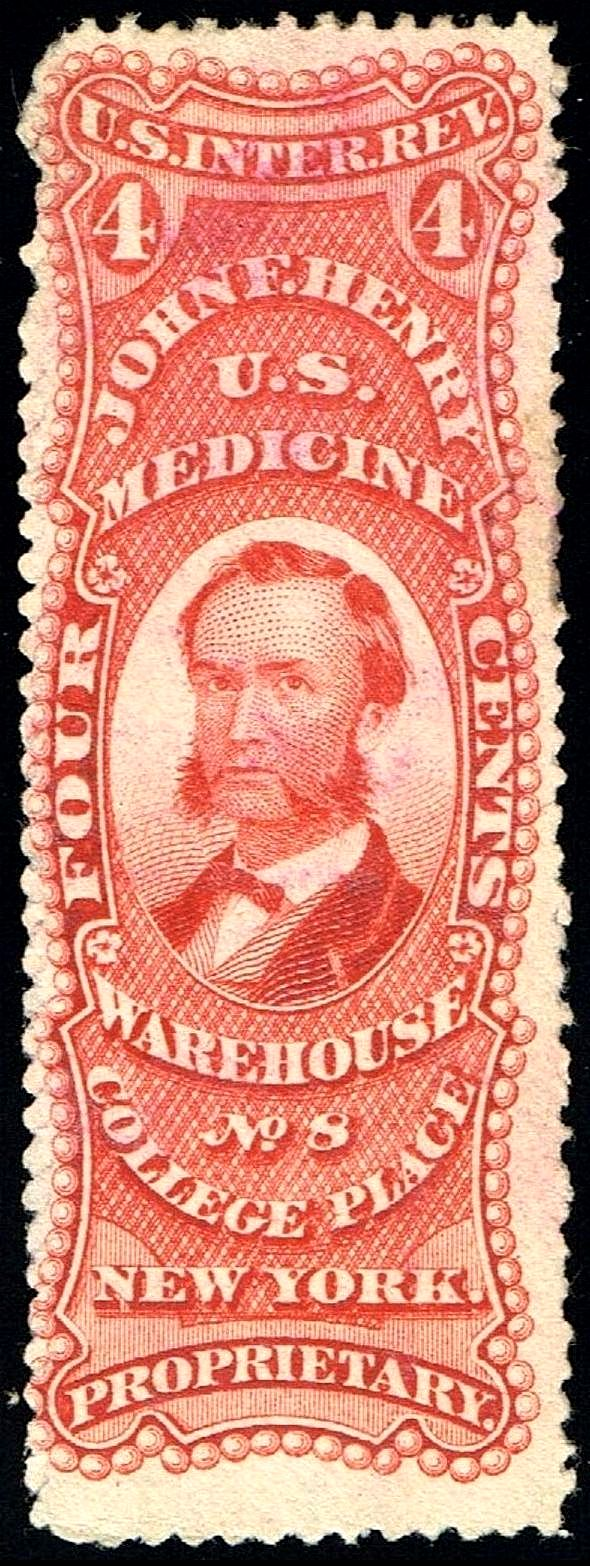
John Henry Co., N.Y., 1862

== Private die proprietary stamps ==
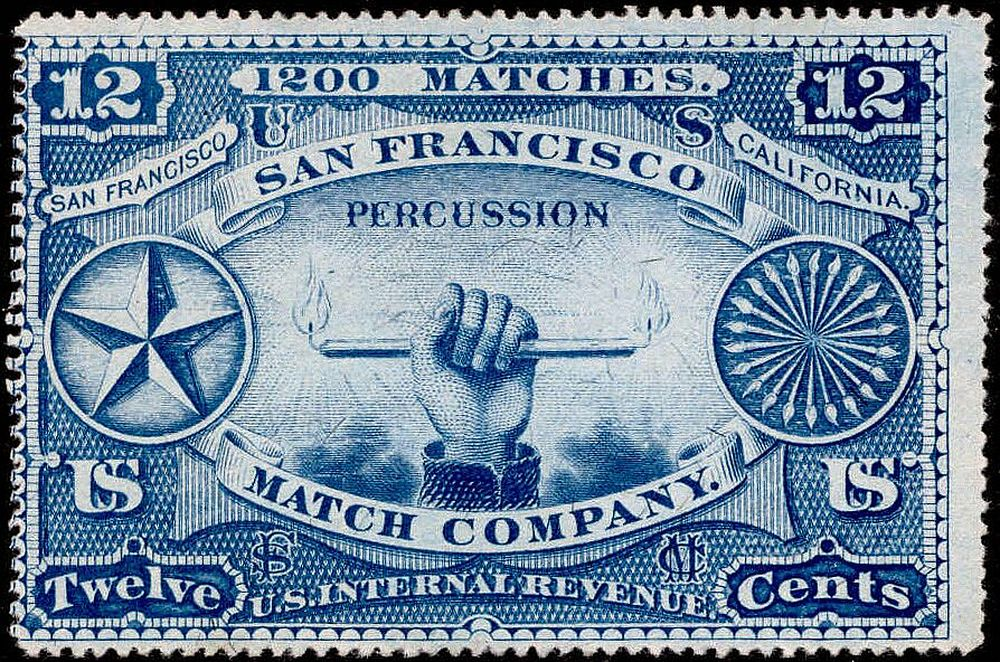
San Francisco Percussion Match Co 12c 1872 issue

After the tax laws were passed in 1862, private proprietors were allowed to furnish their own stamps, subject to the approval of the Internal Revenue and subsequently were granted a discount on the taxes paid for the goods they sold. Private stamps offered the advantage of having the proprietor's name depicted on the stamp. The proprietor paid the cost of engraving the die and the printing plates which in the beginning varied considerably. Some proprietors paid as little as $60 while others paid as much as $750. After June 1, 1863 a uniform cost of $350 was adopted for all dies with a couple of exceptions for large ones.

Most of these stamps were printed by Butler & Carpenter of Philadelphia who also printed revenue stamps for the government. Since many stamps would be used to seal a container or packet they were often long in configuration and would be destroyed upon opening. Four types of paper were used to print private die proprietary stamps. They were printed on white, unwatermarked paper up until September, 1871, commonly referred to as "old paper." Some of this paper contained sparsely scattered silk threads and is considered a minor variety or as "experimental silk." The full "silk paper" contains numerous silk threads and was used between 1871 and 1878. "Pink paper" was also used for a brief period between 1877 and 1878. Watermarked paper, bearing the initials USIR was used from late 1877 to the end of the tax period in 1883. To help provide funding for the Spanish–American War the use of private stamps resumed again from July 1, 1898 until July 1, 1902. A variety of patent medicines, wines and other goods like perfumery and cosmetics were taxed, but only a comparatively small number of companies used private die stamps during this period.

== State revenues ==
As well as Federal revenue stamps, a wide range of state revenues were issued by the various states for various purposes, ranging from sales tax to duck hunting permits.

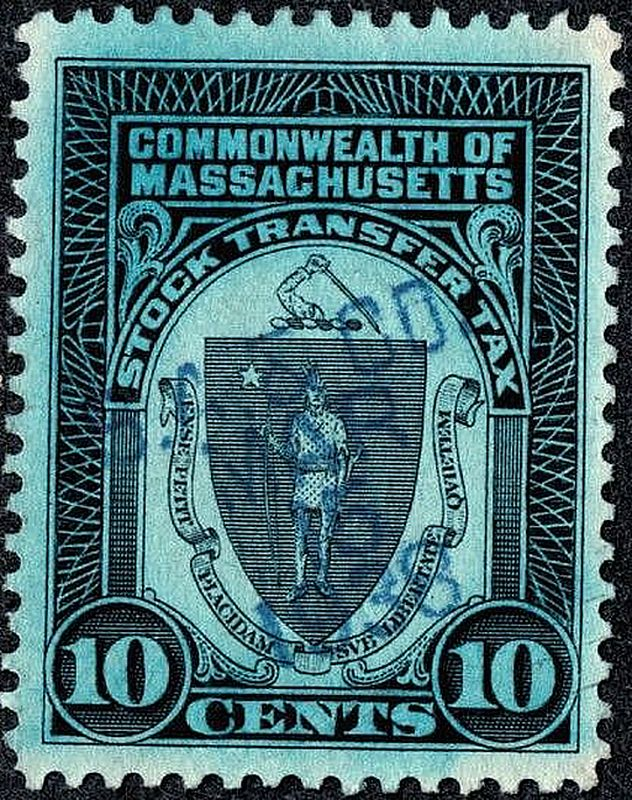
Massachusetts stock transfer tax stamp, 10c

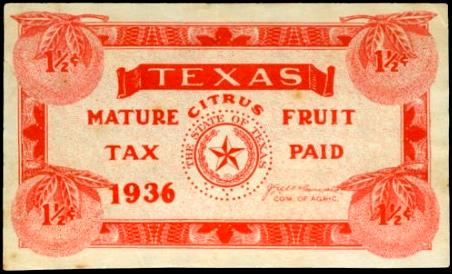
A 1936 Texas state revenue stamp for the tax on citrus fruit.

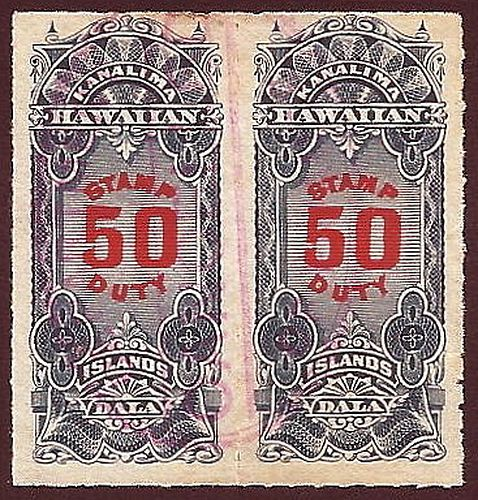
Hawaii revenue stamp, $50

== See also ==
- Postage stamps and postal history of the United States
- George Townsend Turner, prominent revenue stamp collector
- Stamp Act 1765
- Revenue stamps of Hawaii

== Bibliography ==
- Baryla, Bruce (2010). The Civil War Sun Picture Tax; Taxed Photographs 1864–1866.
- Garbade, Kenneth D. (2012). Birth of a Market: The U.S. Treasury Securities Market From the Great War to the Great Depression. MIT Press, Cambridge, Mass.
- Jewell, Elizabeth (2005). U.S. Presidents Factbook. Random House Reference, New York.
- McKinney, W. Arthur (November 1962). "About Stamps". Boys' Life. LVI (11). New Brunswick, NJ: Boy Scouts of America: 81. ISSN 0006-8608.
- Miller, Rick. "Revenue stamps pay tax instead of postage". Linns Stamp News.
- "5000-dollar Washington". Smithsonian National Postal Museum.
- Scott Specialized Catalogue of United States stamps. William W. Cummings, James B. Hatcher. Scott Publishing Company, New York, N.Y. 1982. ISBN 0-89487-042-4.
- "The Whitpain Collection of United States 1894-98 Bureau Issues". Robert A. Siegel Auction Galleries Inc., New York.
- "$500.00 Red Orange, Green & Black, Second Issue, "Large Persian Rug"". Robert A. Siegel Auction Galleries Inc., New York.
- Swain, Steve (2012). "The "Persian Rugs" - Extraordinary U.S. Revenue Stamps". Stamp O'Rama.
- Toppan, George L.; Deats, Hiram E.; Holland, Alexander (1899). Historical reference list of the Revenue Stamps of the United States. Boston Philatelic Society; Salem, Press of Newcomb & Gauss, 423 pages., e'Book, PDF
