= Title 27 of the United States Code =

U.S. federal statutes on alcohol

Title 27 of the United States Code outlines the role of intoxicating liquors in the United States Code.

- 27 U.S.C. ch. 1—General Provisions
- 27 U.S.C. ch. 2—Prohibition of Intoxicating Beverages
- 27 U.S.C. ch. 2A—Beer, Ale, Porter, and Similar Fermented Liquor
- 27 U.S.C. ch. 3—Industrial Alcohol
- 27 U.S.C. ch. 4—Penalties
- 27 U.S.C. ch. 5—Prohibition Reorganization Act of 1930
- 27 U.S.C. ch. 6—Transportation in Interstate Commerce
- 27 U.S.C. ch. 7—Liquor Law Repeal and Enforcement Act
- 27 U.S.C. ch. 8—Federal Alcohol Administration Act
- 27 U.S.C. ch. 9—Liquor Enforcement Act of 1936
