= Prime (disambiguation) =

A prime is a natural number that has exactly two distinct natural number divisors: 1 and itself.

Prime or PRIME may also refer to:

== Arts, entertainment, and media ==
=== Fictional characters ===
- Prime (DC Comics), a superhero-turned-supervillain character better known as Superboy-Prime
- Prime (Malibu Comics), a superhero character
- Prime (Hasbro), title of the fictional characters Optimus Prime
- Dyson Aliens or The Primes, aliens in Peter Hamilton's Commonwealth Saga

=== Music ===
- Prime (music)
- Prime Boys, Canadian hip hop collective
- Prime (percussion), to lightly strike an instrument such as a gong in preparation for playing
- Prime form (music)
- Unison, an interval also called a prime
- Prime (album), an album by Christian McBride
- "Prime", a song by Marnie Stern from This Is It and I Am It and You Are It and So Is That and He Is It and She Is It and It Is It and That Is That, 2008
- "Prime", a song by Sick Individuals, 2015

=== Television channels ===
- AFN Prime, part of the American Forces Network
- BBC Prime, a defunct television channel in Europe and the Middle East
- Fox Sports (Southeast Asian TV network), formerly known as Prime Sports
- Prime (Canadian TV channel), the former name of Canadian cable channel DTour
- PRTV Prime Media, a Philippine television channel
- Prime TV (Dom Eliseu), a local television station in Pará, Brazil
- Prime (Moldovan TV channel)
- Prime (New Zealand TV channel)
- Prime TV Sri Lanka, a defunct Sri Lankan television channel
- Prime Sports, also known as Prime Sports Network and Prime Network, a defunct cable sports network in the United States
- Prime Televisie, the former name of Flemish pay television channel More Play
- Prime7, a television network in Australia owned by Prime Media
- Sports on Amazon Prime Video, streaming and on-demand sports programming available in multiple countries

=== Other uses in arts, entertainment, and media ===
- Prime (film), a 2005 romantic comedy
- Prime lens, a lens which has a fixed focal length, in film and photography
- Prime Number (short story collection), a short story collection by Harry Harrison
- Prime time, a block of slots each evening in broadcast programming
- Prime version, the original version of an artwork existing in several versions
- Sonic Prime, a 2022 TV show in the Sonic the Hedgehog franchise.

== Brands and enterprises ==
- Amazon Prime, a subscription service of Amazon.com
- Prime (drink), a brand of beverages
- Prime Books, an American publisher
- Prime Broadcasting Network, a radio broadcasting network in the Philippines
- Prime Inc., an American trucking company
- Prime Healthcare, an American hospital network
- Prime Media Group, a defunct Australian media corporation
- Prime Media Holdings, an investment holding company in the Philippines
- Prime Medicine, an American biotechnology company

== Finance ==
- Prime (finance)
- Prime rate, a rate of interest applied in banking

== Mathematics ==
- Prime (order theory)
- Prime 3-manifold, a 3-manifold that cannot be written as the connect sum of two nontrivial 3-manifolds
- Prime element, in algebra
- Prime form of a Riemann surface
- Prime ideal, a subset of a ring
- Prime knot, a knot that cannot be written as the knot sum of two non-trivial knots in knot theory
- Prime model, as simple a model as possible in model theory
- Prime polynomial

== People ==
- Prime (graffiti artist) (born 1971) or Jose Reza
- Prime (surname)
- Deion Sanders (born 1967), American pro athlete and coach known as Coach Prime

== Science and technology ==
- a psychological stimulus which causes priming
- PRIME (power-line communication), a power-line communication standard
- PRIME (labeling technique), probe incorporation mediated by enzymes, a molecular biology research tool
- Prime editing, a gene editing technique
- PRIME, a GPU offloading solution for the Linux kernel, used in the Direct Rendering Manager
- HP Prime, a graphing calculator model
- Prime Computer, a producer of minicomputers

== Sports ==
- Prime F.C., a Nigerian football club
- Prime parry, a parry form in fencing
- Prime (cycling), an intermediate sprint within a bicycle race

== Vehicles ==
- Edel Prime Bi, a South Korean paraglider design
- Prius Prime, an automobile
- USS Prime (AM-279), a minesweeper in naval service 1944–46
- USS Prime (AM-466), a minesweeper commissioned in 1954
- X-23 PRIME, an experimental re-entry vehicle

== Other uses ==
- Prime (liturgy), a canonical hour
- Prime (symbol), the ′ mark, typically used as a suffix
- Prime, a grading of meat in beef carcass classification
- Prime rib, or standing rib roast, a cut of beef from the primal rib, one of the primal cuts of beef
- Programme for Rebuilding and Improving Existing Schools, a programme of the Singapore Ministry of Education
- Prime years, the ideal or perfect age

== See also ==
- E-Prime, a modified English syntax and vocabulary lacking all forms of "to be"
- Prima (disambiguation)
- Primal (disambiguation)
- Primer (disambiguation)
- Priming (disambiguation)
- Primus (disambiguation)
