= Kut (disambiguation) =

Kut or KUT may refer to:

== People ==
- Kut (surname)
- Karel Kuttelwascher (Kut; 1916-1959), Czech RAF fighter pilot

== Places ==
- Kut, a city in eastern Iraq
  - Kut Barrage, a barrage (dam) on the Tigris River
- Kut District, Iraq
- Kut, Armenia, town in Gegharkunik Province
- Kut, Abadan, a village in Khuzestan Province, Iran
- Kut, Hendijan, a village in Khuzestan Province, Iran
- Kut, a village in Lukovytsia, Chernivtsi Raion, Chernivtsi Oblast, Ukraine

== War ==
- Siege of Kut, a WWI battle for the Mesopotamian city
- Second Battle of Kut, WWI

== Other uses ==
- KUT 90.5 FM, a public radio station of the University of Texas at Austin
- KUT (Kenya Uganda Tanganyika), postage stamps and postal history of Kenya, Uganda, Tanganyika during British colonial era
- Kut, ISO 639-2 and 639-3 codes for the Kutenai language, a Native American/First Nations language
- Kut or Gut (ritual), by a Korean shaman
- Kút, Hungarian title of 2016 film Well
- Kut (mythology), in Turkic mythology a mystic force
- Kut (spider), a genus of woodlouse hunting spiders
- Finnish National Socialist Labor Organisation (formerly Kansallisen Uudistustyön Työjärjestö)

== See also ==
- All Wikipedia pages beginning with Kut-e (a common element in Iranian place names)
