= Primal =

Primal may refer to:

== Psychotherapy ==
- Primal (in primal therapy), the core concept, which denotes the full reliving and cathartic release of an early traumatic experience
- Primal scene (in psychoanalysis), refers to the fantasizing or witnessing by a young child of a sex act between parents

== Mathematics ==
- Primal, an old mathematics term for a projective hypersurface
- Primal problem, a component of the duality principle in mathematical optimization theory

== Entertainment ==
- "Primal" (Eureka episode), an episode of TV series Eureka
- Primal (video game), an action video game for the PlayStation 2
- Primal (TV series), a 2019 animated television series
- Primal (2019 film), a 2019 film starring Nicolas Cage
- Primal (Marvel Comics), a character in Marvel Comics
- Optimus Primal, a character in Transformers
- The Lost Tribe (2010 film), a film whose Australian DVD was entitled Primal
- Primal (2010 film), an Australian horror film directed by Josh Reed
- Far Cry Primal, a 2016 video game
- Well (film), Hungarian film released as Primal in some countries

== Other ==
- Primal cut, large wholesale parts of meat
- Primal Pictures, the producer of 3D Interactive Anatomy Software

== See also ==
- Primal Fear (disambiguation)
- Prime (disambiguation)
