= Primas (disambiguation) =

Primas may be a plural of prima, a word with multiple meanings. It may also refer to:

- Primate (bishop)
- Primas (film), 2017 Canadian documentary
- Primas (surname)
