= Prima =

Prima may refer to:

== Media ==
- Prima (magazine), a French women's magazine
- Prima (news agency), a human rights news agency in Moscow
- Astro Prima, a Malaysian pay-TV channel
- Prima Games, an American publishing company of video game strategy guides
- Prima SK, a Slovakian television channel
- Prima TV, a Romanian television channel
- Prima televize, a Czech television channel
- Prima (album), a 2026 album by Slovak singer Adéla

== People ==
- Leon Prima (1907–1985), American jazz trumpeter
- Louis Prima (1910–1978), American jazz musician and bandleader
- Louis Prima Jr. (born 1965), American jazz singer

== Transport ==
- Alstom Prima, a locomotive
- Prima Air, a Spanish airline
- Prima-class cruise ship
- Tata Prima, a range of heavy trucks

== Other uses ==
- PRIMA (Indonesia), an interbank network
- Prima (spider), a genus of spiders
- Just and Prosperous People's Party, a political party in Indonesia
- Place of the relevant intermediary approach, a legal doctrine applied in cross-border security transactions
- Prima apple
- Prima BioMed, a biotechnology company
- Prima, a female voice released for Vocaloid 2
- Prima balalaika, an instrument of the balalaika family
- Prima, a fictional machine in Are You Afraid of the Dark? by Sidney Sheldon
- Prima (cigarette)
- PRIMA (spacecraft), a planned space telescope

== See also ==
- Primus (disambiguation)
- Prime (disambiguation)
- Primer (disambiguation)
- Priam (disambiguation)
