= Charles Mooney =

Charles Mooney may refer to:

- Charles Mooney (boxer) (born 1951), American boxer
- Charles W. Mooney Jr. (born 1947), American law professor
- Charles A. Mooney (1879–1931), American businessman and politician from Ohio
- C. P. J. Mooney (Charles Patrick Joseph Mooney, 1865–1926), American newspaper publisher
