= Pryme (surname) =

Pryme is a surname, and may refer to:

- Abraham de la Pryme (1671–1704), English antiquarian
- George Pryme (1781–1868), British economist, academic and politician
- Lew Pryme (1940–1990), New Zealand pop singer and rugby union footballer

== See also ==
- Pryme, Nigerian singer-songwriter
- Eugen Prym (1843–1913), German orientalist
- Friedrich Prym (1841–1915), German mathematician
- Prime (surname)
