= Hague Securities Convention =

Convention on the law applicable to certain rights in respect of securities held with an intermediary
- Signed: 5 July 2006
- Location: The Netherlands
- Effective: 1 April 2017
- Condition: Ratification by 3 states
- Signatories: 3
- Parties: 3 (Mauritius, Switzerland, United States)
- Depositary: Ministry of Foreign Affairs (Netherlands)
- Languages: English and French

The Convention on the law applicable to certain rights in respect of securities held with an intermediary, or Hague Securities Convention is an international multilateral treaty intended to remove, globally, legal uncertainties for cross-border securities transactions. The Convention was drafted under the auspices of the Hague Conference on Private International Law, which as resulted in several Conflict of Laws conventions.

Switzerland, Mauritius and the United States have ratified the convention, which entered into force on 1 April 2017. The European Commission recommended in July 2006 that its member states sign the Convention, but this recommendation was later withdrawn.

== The need for the Convention ==
The Convention is largely a response to the move in recent times in most nations from a purely direct holding system to a mixed direct and indirect holding system. The reforms, though largely beneficial, have created an alarming level of uncertainty as to the question of "what law applies" in cross-border securities transactions. The development of a global agreed-upon method of determining the legal regime governing any such transactions lagged behind market practice, leaving financial markets with significant legal risk.

The problem stems from the fact that intermediaries exist between an investor and the company which issues a particular security.

Historically, many jurisdictions attempted to apply the traditional, but now arguably outdated, lex rei sitae test to securities held with intermediaries, by "looking through" the tiers of intermediaries to the laws of one or more of: the jurisdiction of incorporation of the issuer, the location of the issuer's register, or the location of the actual security certificate (the so-called "look-through approach").

== Europe ==
The Place of the Relevant Intermediary (or "PRIMA") approach was adopted in Europe under the European Union's Settlement Finality Directive of 1998. That directive has been adopted by a number of states. In 2002, the European Community also passed the European Union's Collateral Directive.

Switzerland, which is not part of the European Union and therefore does not have to wait for agreement among all member states, signed the Convention.

== Japan ==
Strong support for Japan joining the Convention has been expressed in Japanese legal circles.

== New test ==
The first Special Commission of the Convention met at The Hague in January 2001 to consider the appropriate conflict of laws rule. At this first meeting, initially the concept embraced by the PRIMA approach was adopted. The next two years of negotiations and meetings were spent determining an appropriate formulation of the language of the convention, and which PRIMA concepts to accept and which to reject. At the end of the negotiations, the idea that the place of the relevant intermediary was the place to focus on was unanimously rejected in lieu of the approach described below.

The fundamental issue during negotiations was to determine a test that would accurately locate the one jurisdiction for any set of circumstances that would be the jurisdiction whose law would apply. The result of the analysis was that for financial institutions with many offices, it is often not possible to point to one particular location. Delegates concluded that a test that tried to actually locate a particular securities account would result in an unacceptable level of impossibility or uncertainty.

Over time a new approach was developed:

- the account holder and relevant intermediary may choose in the account agreement the law to govern the issues under the Convention;
- this choice will be respected under the Hague Convention provided that the chosen law is of a place where the relevant intermediary has an office that is involved in the maintenance of securities accounts (a "qualifying office").

== Main rule ==
The main rule of the Convention can be summarised as follows:

- Article 4: The first step is to look to the law expressly agreed between the account holder and its immediate (relevant) intermediary in the account agreement. If no such express designation is made, but the parties have expressly agreed on the law to govern the account agreement, then the governing law shall govern the issues under the Convention.

The second step is to apply the "qualifying office" test. Art 4(2) contains a "black list" of activities, each of which by itself is not sufficient to constitute maintenance of securities accounts.

Article 5(1): Where the previous rule does not provide a result, and a written account agreement exists which "expressly and unambiguously" states that the relevant intermediary entered into the account agreement through a particular office, the applicable law is the law of the location of that office, provided the "qualifying office" test is fulfilled.

Article 5(2) and (3): These provide a fallback where Art 5(1) provides no answer. Under these provisions, the applicable law is determined with reference to the place of incorporation or organisation of the relevant intermediary, or its principal place of business.

=== Multi-unit states ===
Where the primary rule in Art 4 leads to the law of a territorial unit of a multi-unit state (such as Canada or Australia), Art 12 indicates that the applicable law can be the law of a territorial unit specified in the account agreement provided that the relevant intermediary has a qualifying office somewhere in the multi-unit state.

=== Relevant intermediary as collateral taker ===
In Art 4(3), the Convention expressly provides that it applies in the specific case where an account holder:

1. Holds interests in securities through an intermediary; and
2. Pledges or transfers title to securities held with an intermediary to that particular inventory.

In this situation, the Convention provides that the relevant intermediary is the account holder's own intermediary, and the account agreement between the account holder and its intermediary is the relevant account agreement to determine the law governing either perfection or completion.

== Other issues ==
Other issues governed by the Convention include:

- Issues of priority between competing dispositions;
- The requirements for the realisation of such an interest; and
- The duties of an intermediary to competing claimants to an interest in securities held with the intermediary.

== Other related international conventions ==
In 2003, Unidroit started a negotiation process with a view to harmonise the material aspects of intermediated securities. The purpose is to achieve a further step towards legal integration of securities markets, that consist not only in identifying the applicable law, but also in harmonising some parts of the legislation of the signatory States. These negotiations eventually reached the adoption, in October 2009, of the Geneva Securities Convention.
