= Cape Town (disambiguation) =

Cape Town is the legislative capital of South Africa.

Cape Town or Capetown may also refer to:

- City of Cape Town, the metropolitan municipality that includes Cape Town and surrounding areas
- Cape Town (TV series), South African-German produced TV series
- HMS Capetown (D88), a light cruiser of the Royal Navy
- Capetown, California, United States

== See also ==
- Cape Town Treaty, or The Cape Town Convention on International Interests in Mobile Equipment
- Cape Town railway station, the main Metrorail station in Cape Town
