= Primus (name) =

Primus (Latin, 'first') is used as a name. It is also used after a name to designate the first born in a series of people with the same name, e.g. Alexander Monro (primus) (1697–1767).

People with the name include:

- Pope Primus of Alexandria, pope and patriarch of Alexandria 106–118
- Saint Primus (died c. 297), Christian martyr
- Barry Primus (born 1938), American actor
- Brent Primus (born 1985), American mixed martial artist
- Greg Primus (born 1970), American footballer
- Guy Primus (born 1969), American entrepreneur and inventor
- Hannes Primus (1976–2025), Austrian politician
- Hubertus Primus (born 1955), German lawyer and journalist
- James Primus (born 1964), American footballer
- Linvoy Primus (born 1973), English footballer
- Matthew Primus (born 1975), Australian rules footballer
- Nelson A. Primus (1842–1916), African-American artist
- Pearl Primus (1919–1994), American choreographer and dancer
- Richard Primus (born 1969), American law scholar
- Robert Primus (born 1990), Trinidadian footballer
- Robert E. Primus, American government official
- Roberto Primus (born 1949), Italian cross-country skier
- Roshon Primus (born 1995), Barbadian cricketer

== See also ==
- Primus (disambiguation)
- Secundus (disambiguation)
