= Proximity labeling =

Laboratory technique

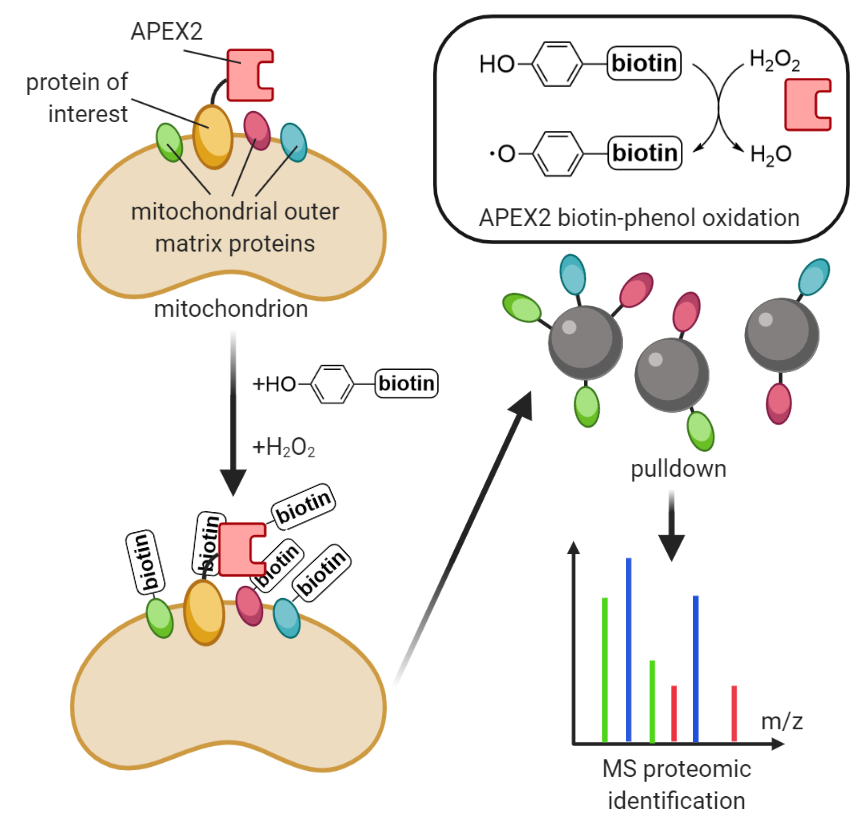
Mitochondrial outer membrane proteins are identified via proximity labeling.

Enzyme-catalyzed proximity labeling (PL), also known as proximity-based labeling, is a laboratory technique that labels biomolecules, usually proteins or RNA, proximal to a protein of interest. By creating a gene fusion in a living cell between the protein of interest and an engineered labeling enzyme, biomolecules spatially proximal to the protein of interest can then be selectively marked with biotin for pulldown and analysis. Proximity labeling has been used for identifying the components of novel cellular structures and for determining protein-protein interaction partners, among other applications.

== History ==
Before the development of proximity labeling, determination of protein proximity in cells relied on studying protein-protein interactions through methods such as affinity purification-mass spectrometry and proximity ligation assays.

DamID is a method developed in 2000 by Steven Henikoff for identifying parts of the genome proximal to a chromatin protein of interest. DamID relies on a DNA methyltransferase fusion to the chromatin protein to nonnaturally methylate DNA, which can then be subsequently sequenced to reveal genome methylation sites near the protein. Researchers were guided by the fusion protein strategy of DamID to create a method for site-specific labeling of protein targets, culminating in the creation of the biotin protein labelling-based BioID in 2012. Alice Ting and the Ting lab at Stanford University have engineered several proteins that demonstrate improvements in biotin-based proximity labeling efficacy and speed.

== Principles ==
Proximity labeling relies on a labeling enzyme that can biotinylate nearby biomolecules promiscuously. Biotin labeling can be achieved through several different methods, depending on the species of labeling enzyme. BioID and TurboID rely on exogenous biotin supplementation; APEX and APEX2 utilize exogenous biotin phenol and hydrogen peroxide.

- BioID, also known as BirA*, is a mutant E. coli biotin ligase that catalyzes the activation of biotin by ATP. The activated biotin is short-lived and thus can only diffuse to a region proximal to BioID. Labeling is achieved when the activated biotin reacts with nearby amines, such as the lysine sidechain amines found in proteins. TurboID is a biotin ligase engineered via yeast surface display directed evolution. TurboID, an enhanced variant of BioID, enables ~10 minute labeling times instead of the ~18 hour labeling times required by BioID. Split-TurboID can be used for proximity labeling in a manner dependent on an independent protein-protein interaction requiring two halves of TurboID to colocalize.
- APEX is an ascorbate peroxidase derivative reliant on hydrogen peroxide for catalyzing the oxidation of biotin-tyramide, also known as biotin-phenol, to a short-lived and reactive biotin-phenol free radical. Labeling is achieved when this intermediate reacts with various functional groups of nearby biomolecules. APEX can also be used for local deposition of diaminobenzidine, a precursor for an electron microscopy stain. APEX2 is a derivative of APEX engineered via yeast surface display directed evolution. APEX2 shows improved labeling efficiency and cellular expression levels.
- APEX and APEX2 generate highly reactive phenoxyl radical intermediates from cell-permeable biotin-phenol. These intermediates primarily interact with tyrosine and tryptophan residues on labeled proteins and guanosine on labeled RNAs. Direct DNA labeling is significantly less efficient than RNA labeling. BioID and TurboID create biotinyl-AMP intermediates from endogenous ATP and endogenous or exogenous biotin to label colocalized lysine residues or N-terminus primary amines on neighboring proteins. Constitutive TurboID biotinylation with endogenous biotin and ATP may be cytotoxic in some cases.

To label proteins nearby a protein of interest, a typical proximity labeling experiment begins by cellular expression of an APEX2 fusion to the protein of interest, which localizes to the protein of interest's native environment. Cells are next incubated with biotin-phenol, then briefly with hydrogen peroxide, initiating biotin-phenol free radical generation and labeling. To minimize cellular damage, the reaction is then quenched using an antioxidant buffer. Cells are lysed and the labeled proteins are pulled down with streptavidin beads. The proteins are digested with trypsin, and finally the resulting peptidic fragments are analyzed using shotgun proteomics methods such as LC-MS/MS or SPS-MS^{3}.

If instead a protein fusion is not genetically accessible (such as in human tissue samples) but an antibody for the protein of interest is known, proximity labeling can still be enabled by fusing a labeling enzyme with the antibody, then incubating the fusion with the sample.

== Applications ==
Proximity labeling methods have been used to study the proteomes of biological structures that are otherwise difficult to isolate purely and completely, such as cilia, mitochondria, postsynaptic clefts, p-bodies, stress granules, and lipid droplets.

Fusion of APEX2 with G-protein coupled receptors (GPCRs) allows for both tracking GPCR signaling at a 20-second temporal resolution and also identification of unknown GPCR-linked proteins.

Proximity labeling has also been used for transcriptomics and interactomics. In 2019, Alice Ting and the Ting lab have used APEX to identify RNA localized to specific cellular compartments. In 2019, BioID has been tethered to the beta-actin mRNA transcript to study its localization dynamics. Proximity labeling has also been used to find interaction partners of heterodimeric protein phosphatases, of the miRISC (microRNA-induced silencing complex) protein Ago2, and of ribonucleoproteins.

== Recent developments ==
TurboID-based proximity labeling has been used to identify regulators of a receptor involved in the innate immune response, a NOD-like receptor. BioID-based proximity labeling has been used to identify the molecular composition of breast cancer cell invadopodia, which are important for metastasis. Biotin-based proximity labeling studies demonstrate increased protein tagging of intrinsically disordered regions, suggesting that biotin-based proximity labeling can be used to study the roles of IDRs. A photosensitizer nucleus-targeted small molecule has also been developed for photoactivatable proximity labeling.

== Photocatalytic-based Proximity Labeling ==
A new frontier in the field of proximity labeling exploits the utility of photocatalysis to achieve high spatial and temporal resolution of proximal protein microenvironments. This photocatalytic technology leverages the photonic energy of iridium-based photocatalysts to activate diazirine probes that can tag proximal proteins within a tight radius of about four nanometers. This technology was developed by the Merck Exploratory Science Center in collaboration with researchers at Princeton University. This technology was spun out of the Merck Exploratory Science Center into InduPro, a biotech company founded in 2022 by three Merck scientists, including Rob Oslund and Niyi Fadeyi, who co-invented the mapping technology.
