= Lukovytsia =

Lukovytsia may refer to one of several places in Ukraine:

- Lukovytsia, Kaniv Raion
- Lukovytsia, Chernivtsi Raion, Chernivtsi Oblast
- Lukovytsia, a village in Hodynivka, Chernivtsi Raion, Chernivtsi Oblast
