= Charles W. Mooney Jr. =

American law professor

- Born: August 13, 1947 (age 79); Shawnee, Oklahoma
- Occupations: Law professor and law school administrator
- Title: Charles A. Heimbold, Jr. Professor of Law

Academic background
- Education: University of Oklahoma (BA); Harvard Law School (JD)

Academic work
- Institutions: University of Pennsylvania Law School
- Main interests: Commercial law and bankruptcy law

Charles ("Chuck") W. Mooney Jr. (born August 13, 1947) is the Charles A. Heimbold, Jr. Professor of Law at the University of Pennsylvania Law School, as well as the former interim Dean of the law school.

== Education and law practice ==
Mooney was born in Shawnee, Oklahoma.

He attended the University of Oklahoma, where he obtained his BA in 1969, and Harvard Law School, where he earned his JD in 1972. He was admitted to the bar in Oklahoma in 1972, in New York in 1982, and in Pennsylvania in 1988.

From 1976 to 1979, he was an adjunct professor at Oklahoma City University.

From 1977 to 1981, Mooney was a partner at the law firm Crowe & Dunleavy in Oklahoma City, Oklahoma. From 1981 to 1986, he was a partner at the law firm Shearman & Sterling in New York City. From 1994 to 2003, he was a consultant at the law firm Morgan, Lewis & Bockius.

== Biography ==
Mooney is the Charles A. Heimbold, Jr. Professor of Law at the University of Pennsylvania Law School. There, he has also been interim dean (1999–2000) and associate dean for Academic Affairs (1998–2000 and 2008–2009). He has been a visiting professor at Georgetown University Law Center, University of Virginia School of Law, Universitat Pompeu Fabra, Waseda University, University of Tokyo, and Gakushuin University.

Mooney's specialties are commercial law and bankruptcy law. He is the author of Security Interests in Personal Property (with Steven Harris, 6th ed. 2015). Mooney was awarded the Distinguished Service Award in 2002 by the American College of Commercial Finance Lawyers.

He served as a United States delegate at the Diplomatic Conference for the Cape Town Convention on International Interests in Mobile Equipment and the Aircraft Protocol, and at the Diplomatic Conference for the Unidroit (Geneva) Convention on Intermediated Securities. Mooney also served as a co-reporter for the Drafting Committee for the Revision of Uniform Commercial Code (UCC) Article 9 (Secured Transactions), as the American Bar Association (ABA) liaison-advisor to the Permanent Editorial Board for the UCC, and as a member of council and chair of the Committee on UCC of the ABA Business Law Section.

== Selected publications ==
- Charles W. Mooney, Localized History of Pottawatomie County, Oklahoma to 1907, 1971
- Charles W. Mooney, Letters of Credit and Bankers' Acceptances, 1985, Practising Law Institute, 1985
- Charles W. Mooney, Jr., "Relationship between the Prospective UNIDROIT International Registry, Revised Uniform Commercial Code Article 9 and National Civil Aviation Registries", 4 Unif. L. Rev. n.s. 335 (1999)
- Charles W. Mooney, Jr., "Contract Practices under the Cape Town Convention," The Legal Advisory Panel of the Aviation Working Group, Cape Town Papers Series, Volume I, 9 Uniform Law Review Issue 3, August 2004, Pages 703–04, ISBN 90-77801-01-4.
- Steven L. Harris, Charles W. Mooney, Security Interests in Personal Property: Cases, Problems, and Materials, Foundation Press, 2006
- Charles W. Mooney, Jr., "Private Law and the Regulation of Securities Intermediaries: Perspectives under the Geneva Securities Convention and United States Law," 15 Uniform Law Review, 3-4, August–December 2010, Pages 801–13
- Charles W. Mooney, Jr., Marek Dubovec, William Brydie-Watson, "The mining, agricultural and construction equipment protocol to the Cape Town Convention project: The current status," 21 Uniform Law Review 2-3, August 2016, Pages 332–60
- Charles W. Mooney, Jr., "Choice-of-law Rules for Secured Transactions: An Interest-Based and Modern Principles-Based Framework for Assessment", 22 Uniform L. Rev. 842 (2017)

Preceded by Colin Diver	Interim Dean of the University of Pennsylvania Law School; 1999-2000	Succeeded by Michael Fitts
