= Primož =

Primož is a male given name, the South Slavic (primarily Slovenian) form of the Latin "Primus", meaning "first" or "best". Sequential birth-order numerical names were a Roman custom; a male firstborn might be named Primus, a third-born tertia Tertius, a fifth-born son Quintus, etc. The name Primož has Slavified equivalents in Prvan, Prvin and Prvoslav.

== Slovene variants ==
Primo and Primoš, both being archaic or obsolete variants.

== List of people named Primož ==
- Primož Benko, Slovene guitarist
- Primož Brezec, Slovene basketballer
- Primož Jakopin, Slovene computer scientist
- Primož Kozmus, Slovene athlete and Olympian
- Primož Kuret, Slovene musicologist
- Primož Lorenz, Slovene pianist
- Primož Parovel, Slovene accordion player
- Primož Peterka, Slovene ski jumper
- Primož Ramovš, Slovene composer and librarian
- Primož Roglič, a Slovenian racing cyclist
- Primož Siter, Slovene activist, musician and politician
- Primož Trubar, Slovene Protestant reformer and priest
- Primož Ulaga, Yugoslavian/Slovenian former ski jumper
- Primož Urh-Zupan, Slovene ski jumper
