= Place of the relevant intermediary approach =

The place of the relevant intermediary approach (PRIMA) is a conflict of laws rule applied to the proprietary aspects of security transactions, especially collateral transactions. It is an alternative approach to the historically important look-through approach, and was in its earliest form the basis for the initial draft of the Hague Securities Convention.

Unlike the look-through approach, PRIMA does not look through the various tiers of intermediaries to the underlying securities. Rather, it stops at the level of the intermediary immediately above the parties to the pledge or transfer. Its important advantage is that it subjects an investor's interest in securities to the law of a single jurisdiction, even where evidence of underlying securities is situated in many different countries, or where various issuers in a single portfolio is involved. This provides certainty and clarity for all parties involved.

It is a matter of debate whether PRIMA constitutes a development of the traditional lex rei sitae principle or should be regarded as a new concept.

PRIMA was adopted in a number of jurisdictions as the conflict of laws rule to be applied to the proprietary aspects of collateral transactions. It has given way, with the Hague Securities Convention, to the approach described below.

== Type I PRIMA ==
The so-called Type I PRIMA dates back to the late 1960s, in Belgium. Under Belgian law, the interest in respect of the underlying securities held by an investor and recorded on the books of its intermediary is treated as a different asset from the underlying securities. Thus the Belgian approach is an application of PRIMA, as well as being linked to the lex rei sitae tradition.

Such an approach causes problems in some legal systems, notable of which are those of Japan and Germany. Under both their systems, an investor would be treated as the direct owner of the underlying securities even though the security is held through tiers of intermediaries. The direct ownership in the underlying securities makes it difficult to argue that the location of the asset is at the level of an intermediary.

=== Adoption in Europe; and anticipated changes ===
Article 9(2) of the European Union's Settlement Finality Directive of 1998 introduced PRIMA in all European Union member states. In Germany, where investors have direct ownership rights in underlying securities, implementing Art 9(2) into domestic law has severed the connection with the traditional lex rei sitae approach.

In 2002, the European Community passed the European Union's Collateral Directive, which is also based on a Type I application of PRIMA. Under Art 9, characterisation, perfection and other issues relating to the provisions of securities as collateral are governed by the law of the State where the securities account is maintained. The majority of member states have yet to implement this directive. Switzerland has now signed the Convention.

== Type II (a non-PRIMA approach) ==
In the United States, a different solution has been adopted. Under Art 8 of the Uniform Commercial Code (UCC), the applicable law is not determined by reference to the location of the asset. Instead, parties to the relevant account agreement are able to choose the applicable law.

== Formulating a modern post-PRIMA approach ==
The first Special Commission of the Convention met at The Hague in January 2001 to consider the appropriate conflict of laws rule. At this first meeting, initially the concept embraced by the PRIMA approach was adopted. The next two years of negotiations and meetings were spent determining an appropriate formulation of the language of the convention, and which PRIMA concepts to accept and which to reject. At the end of the negotiations, the idea that the place of the relevant intermediary was the place to focus on was unanimously rejected in lieu of the approach described below.

The fundamental issue during negotiations was to determine a test that would accurately locate the one jurisdiction for any set of circumstances that would be the jurisdiction whose law would apply. The result of the analysis was that for financial institutions with many offices, it is often not possible to point to one particular location. Delegates concluded that a test that tried to actually locate a particular securities account would result in an unacceptable level of impossibility or uncertainty.

Over time a new approach was developed:

the account holder and relevant intermediary may choose in the account agreement the law to govern the issues under the Convention;

this choice will be respected under the Hague Convention provided that the chosen law is of a place where the relevant intermediary has an office that is involved in the maintenance of securities accounts (a "qualifying office").
