= Priem =

Priem is a surname. Notable people with the surname include:

- Cees Priem (born 1950), Dutch professional road bicycle racer
- Curtis Priem, American computer scientist
- Paul Priem (1893 – 1943), German officer at Oflag IV-C, Colditz Castle
- Tristan Priem (born 1976), Australian racing cyclist

== See also ==
- Prime (surname)
