= Look-through approach =

The look-through approach is a conflict of laws rule applied to the proprietary aspects of security transactions. It is an application of the traditional lex rei sitae (where the property is situated).

The approach is feasible where registered securities are held entirely through non-fungible accounts, in which securities attributable to an intermediary's individual customers are separately identified and credited to separate designated accounts in the books of the intermediary. Under such structures, the investor's interest will be recorded at each level and it is appropriate to treat the investor's interest as located at the place indicated under the traditional lex rei sitae test.

== Difficulties of application ==
The look-through approach has lost applicability due to the increasing complexity of cross-border securities transactions brought about by the introduction of an indirect holding system. There are severe conceptual, legal and practical difficulties with continuing to apply the look-through approach.

Under the indirect holding system, securities are held through fungible accounts (omnibus accounts). Under such a system, there is no record of an individual investor's interest in respect of the securities at the level of the issuer's or intermediary's register, other than the intermediary with whom the investor has a direct relationship. Thus, if the investor, or a person such as a collateral taker asserting a claim against the investor's interest were to try to enforce that claim at any of these higher levels, the response would be that no record exists of any interest against which the claim could be pursued. This problem demonstrates that any attempt to apply the look-through approach under a fungible custody structure runs counter to the widespread conflict of laws principle that jurisdiction over proprietary aspects of dispositions of movable property should broadly be attributed to the jurisdiction where orders in respect of that property are capable of being enforced.

=== Practical difficulties ===
The look-through approach also creates severe practical difficulties:

- In many jurisdictions determining the applicable law is problematic, as a number of possible answers are available.
- It is often not possible to obtain the information needed to satisfy the test. In some circumstances underlying securities certificates may be kept in more than one jurisdiction. If the applicable law is the law of the place where the relevant securities certificates are stored, and the holding is through various tiers of intermediaries a collateral taker may be unable to discover where the securities certificates in questions are actually located.
- Where a diversified portfolio of securities with issuers from a number of jurisdictions is involved, the laws of a number of different jurisdictions may be applicable.

Uncertainties as to the approach, and of the look-through approach, if applicable, lead to significant expense for market participants. Because the position in many cases cannot be satisfactorily determined, there remains an element of systemic risk.

=== Personal or contractual claim ===
If an investor holds merely contractual rights against its intermediary for delivery of securities, it no longer seems accurate to refer to the lex rei sitae, which is a property law concept. Rather, the applicable law has to be ascertained by reference to the conflict of laws principles for contractual matters. These principles would lead to the application of the law of the intermediary, be it under the heading of the "characteristic obligation", "the most significant relationship" or "the proper law".

== Alternatives ==
The "Place of the Relevant Intermediary Approach" (or "PRIMA") is increasingly being favoured over the look-through approach. It is the basis for the Hague Securities Convention, which if ratified, will supersede the look-through approach globally. In January 2001, at the first Special Commission of the Hague Securities Convention, the look-through approach was resoundingly rejected by the 119 experts in attendance.
