= The Commercial Appeal =

Daily newspaper of Memphis, Tennessee

- The April 8, 2016 front page of The Commercial Appeal
- Type: Daily newspaper
- Format: Broadsheet
- Owner: USA Today Co.
- President: Mike Jung
- Editor: Mark Russell
- Founded: 1841 (as The Appeal)
- Headquarters: 495 Union Avenue; Memphis, Tennessee, 38103; United States
- Circulation: 29,000 Average print circulation 10,063 Digital Subscribers
- ISSN: 0745-4856
- OCLC number: 9227552
- Website: commercialappeal.com

The Commercial Appeal (also known as the Memphis Commercial Appeal) is a daily newspaper of Memphis, Tennessee, and its surrounding metropolitan area. It is owned by the Gannett Company; its former owner, the E. W. Scripps Company, also owned the former afternoon paper, the Memphis Press-Scimitar, which it folded in 1983. The 2016 purchase by Gannett of Journal Media Group (Scripps' direct successor) effectively gave it control of the two major papers in western and central Tennessee, uniting the Commercial Appeal with Nashville's The Tennessean.

The Commercial Appeal is a six-day morning paper. It is distributed primarily in Greater Memphis, including Shelby, Fayette, and Tipton counties in Tennessee; DeSoto, Tate, and Tunica counties in Mississippi; and in Crittenden County in Arkansas. These are the contiguous counties to the city of Memphis.

The Commercial Appeal won the 1923 Pulitzer Prize for Public Service for its opposition of the Ku Klux Klan's operations in the region. In 1994, the newspaper won a Pulitzer Prize for Editorial Cartooning by Michael Ramirez.

== History ==
The paper's name comes from a 19th-century merger between two predecessors, the Memphis Commercial and the Appeal.

=== The Appeal ===
The Commercial Appeal traces its heritage to the 1839 publication, The Western World & Memphis Banner of the Constitution. Bought by Col. Henry Van Pelt in 1840, it was renamed The Memphis Appeal. During the American Civil War the Appeal was one of the major pro-Confederate newspapers, and its editor Benjamin Dill was one of the most wanted Confederates of the war. On June 6, 1862, the presses and plates were loaded into a boxcar and published from Grenada, Mississippi. The Appeal later journeyed on to Jackson, Mississippi, Meridian, Mississippi, Atlanta, Georgia, Montgomery, Alabama and finally Columbus, Georgia, where the plates were destroyed on April 16, 1865, temporarily halting publication days before the Confederate surrender. The press was hidden and saved, and publication resumed in Memphis on November 5, 1865.

=== History ===
Another early paper, The Avalanche, was incorporated in 1894, publishing as The Appeal-Avalanche until an 1894 merger created The Commercial Appeal. The name is properly The Commercial Appeal and not the Memphis Commercial Appeal as it is often called, although the predecessor Appeal was formally the Memphis Daily Appeal. From the late 19th century through the first quarter of the 20th century, The Commercial Appeal was led by editor C. P. J. Mooney, "tireless, combative and a devoutly Catholic teetotaler".

In 1932, the newspaper moved into a disused Ford Motor Company assembly plant at 495 Union Avenue, where it stayed until 1977, when a new building was completed adjacent.

In 1936, The Commercial Appeal was purchased by the Scripps Howard newspaper chain,. Its sister afternoon paper, the Press-Scimitar, was discontinued in 1983.

The Commercial Appeal was folded into the Journal Media Group by successor E. W. Scripps Company in 2015 after Scripps purchased Milwaukee's Journal Communications and chose to spin off its newspaper assets to expand its broadcasting operations. Gannett then purchased Journal Media Group several months later, taking control of the Commercial Appeal in April 2016. Gannett then closed the Commercial Appeal's Memphis printing plant after taking control, laying off 19 full-time employees, with the paper then printed at Gannett's existing newspaper in nearby Jackson, the Sun. The company's west Tennessee printing operations then were consolidated out-of-state in February 2021, when the plant for Jackson, Mississippi's The Clarion-Ledger began to print the Commercial Appeal and Sun.

=== Sale of real estate assets ===
In April 2018, The Commercial Appeal sold its longtime offices and plant at 495 Union Avenue in Memphis for $3.8 million, indicating plans to move to another Memphis site. At the time of sale, the property, comprised a 125,000-square-foot office building, a 150,000-square-foot printing and production plant, and adjacent real estate. A New York-based real estate company, Twenty Lake Holdings LLC, bought the 6.5 acres with the five-story office building and attached printing/production building. Twenty Lake Holdings is a division of a hedge fund that has been accused of a "mercenary strategy" of buying newspapers, slashing jobs, and selling the buildings and other assets.

In March 2022, The Commercial Appeal moved to a six day printing schedule, eliminating its printed Saturday edition.

In October 2025, the paper switched from carrier to postal delivery.

== Content ==
=== Columnists ===
The paper in the 1940s had a well known columnist named Paul Flowers who wrote "The Greenhouse" column.

Lydel Sims was a columnist for the Commercial Appeal from 1949 until his death in 1995.

=== Civil rights ===
The Commercial Appeal has had a mixed record on civil rights. In 1868, it published an article by former confederate general Albert Pike that was critical of the methods of the Ku Klux Klan, but lauded their aims of white supremacy. In 1917, the paper published the scheduled time and place for the upcoming Lynching of Ell Persons.

Despite its Confederate background the paper won a Pulitzer Prize in 1923 for its coverage and editorial opposition to the resurgent Ku Klux Klan.

From 1916 to 1968, the paper published a cartoon called Hambone's Meditations. The cartoon featured a black man, Hambone, that many African Americans came to regard as a racist caricature.

During the Civil Rights Movement, the paper generally avoided coverage of the topic. It did take a stance against pro-segregation rioters during the Ole Miss riot of 1962. However, its owner, Scripps-Howard, exerted a generally conservative and anti-union influence.

The paper opposed the Memphis sanitation strike, portraying both labor organizers and Martin Luther King Jr. as outside meddlers.

During the late 1960s, the Federal Bureau of Investigation (FBI) leaked "information of a derogatory nature regarding the Invaders [a local black nationalist group] and other black nationalist militants," some of which may have been fabricated by the FBI itself, to a Commercial Appeal reporter who then used that information to write articles critical of the Invaders. This manipulation of The Commercial Appeal was part of the FBI's counterintelligence program (COINTELPRO) against black nationalists in the late 1960s and early 1970s.

=== Monetization controversy ===
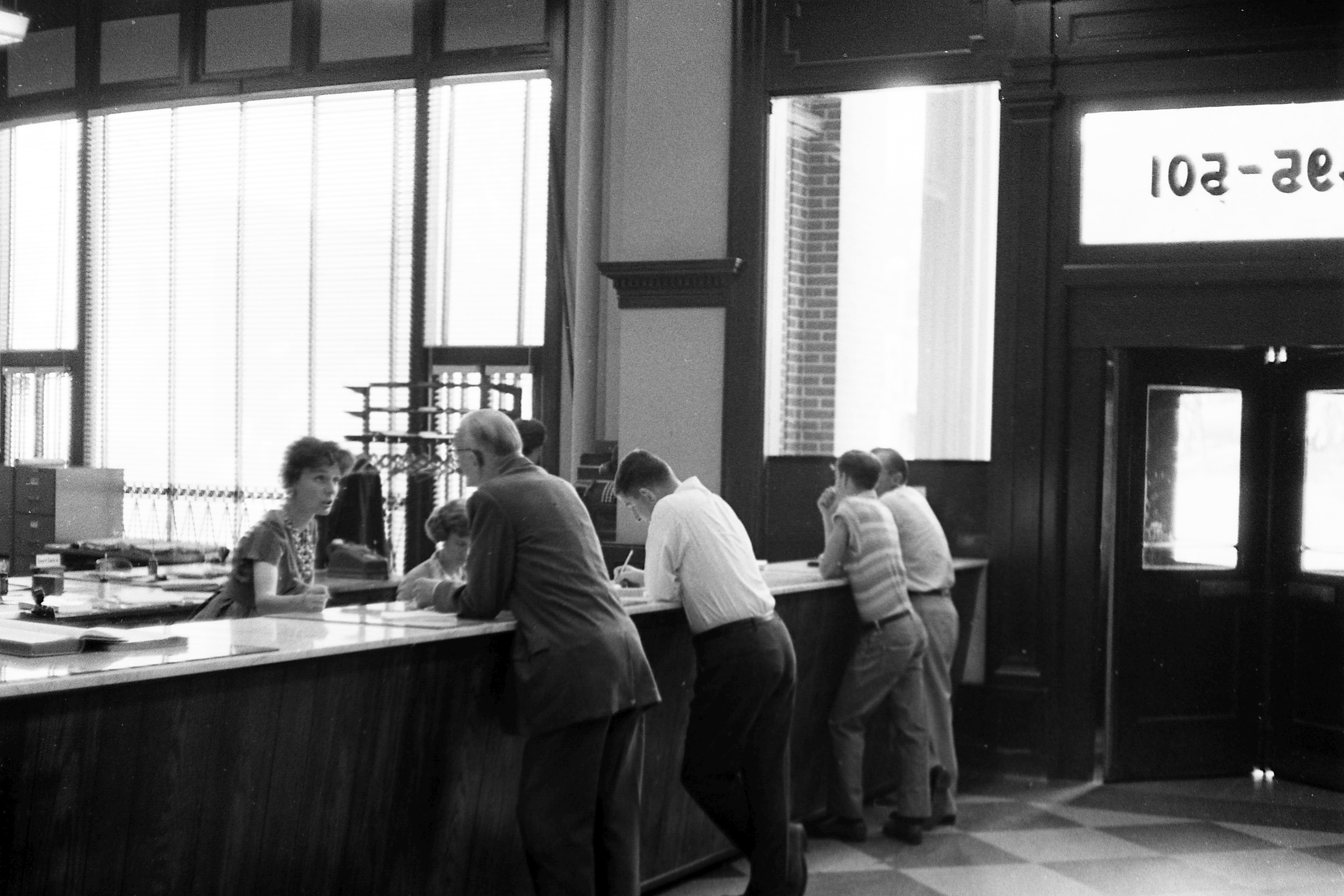
Advertising copy agents at The Commercial Appeal take orders for advertisements in the Old Commercial Appeal Building at 495 Union Avenue in Memphis, Tennessee, in 1961

In the fall of 2007, the Appeal attempted to launch a native advertising effort that would have linked specific stories to specific advertisers who paid for what would be considered an advertorial. The proposal was greeted by outrage among media analysts, so the authors of the so-called "monetization memo"—the Appeal's editor and its sales manager—quietly withdrew the effort.

=== Guns database ===
At the end of 2008, The Commercial Appeal posted a controversial database listing Tennessee residents with permits to carry handguns. The database is a public record in Tennessee but had not been posted online. After a permit-to-carry holder shot and killed a man in Memphis for parking too close to his SUV and vandalizing it, the gun database suddenly came to the attention of pro-gun groups, including the NRA and the Tennessee Firearms Association. Legislators who supported gun groups quickly drafted a bill to close the permit-to-carry database. The Tennessee Coalition for Open Government lobbied to keep the database public and the bill to close the database did not pass in the 2009 legislative session.

In a February 15, 2009 editorial, the newspaper defended publication of the handgun permit list and suggested it could protect permit holders by steering criminals away from armed households. An independent study released in 2011 found "[Memphis] ZIP Codes with the highest concentration of permits experienced roughly 1.7 fewer burglaries per week/per ZIP Code in the 15 weeks following the publicization of the database, and those with the lowest concentration experienced on average 1.5 more burglaries."

The Commercial Appeal website for the database currently notes that on April 25, 2013, a law was signed that classified information contained in handgun carry permit applications as "confidential" available only to the court or to law enforcement. The State Attorney General did not restrict publication of existing copies of the database; the Commercial Appeal has indicated that it will maintain its April 19, 2013 updated database "until the newspaper determines the information is too outdated and no longer serves the public's interests."

== See also ==
- List of newspapers in Tennessee
