= Kut (spider) =

Scientific classification
- Kingdom: Animalia
- Phylum: Arthropoda
- Subphylum: Chelicerata
- Class: Arachnida
- Order: Araneae
- Infraorder: Araneomorphae
- Family: Dysderidae
- Genus: Kut; Kunt, Elverici, Yağmur & Özkütük, 2019

Type species
- Harpactocrates troglophilus (Brignoli, 1978)

Species
- Kut dimensis Kunt, Elverici, Yağmur & Özkütük, 2019; Kut izmiricus Kunt, Elverici, Yağmur & Özkütük, 2019; Kut troglophilus (Brignoli, 1978)

Genus of spiders

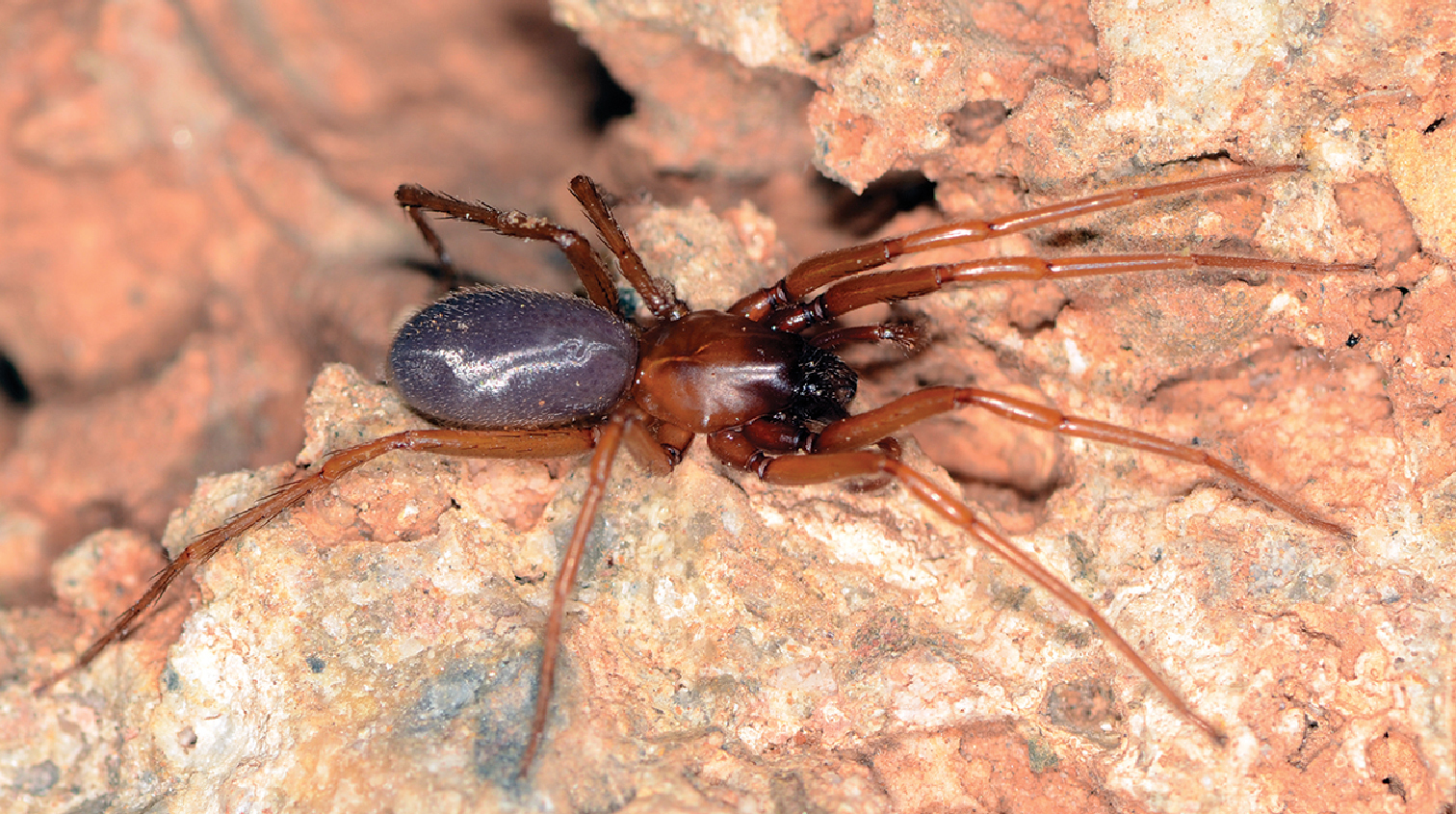

Kut is a genus of Middle Eastern woodlouse hunting spiders. The type species was first described by Paolo Brignoli from a male found in Turkey, and it was placed with Harpactocrates. In a 1988 study, Christa L. Deeleman-Reinhold expressed doubt of the holotype's placement, but it wasn't transferred to its own genus until 2019. Two other species were identified, all with the same distinctive pedipalp features, including a pear-shaped tegulum with an otherwise featureless embolus. As of April 2022 it contains only three species: K. dimensis, K. izmiricus, and K. troglophilus.

== See also ==
- Harpactocrates
- Hygrocrates
- Dysderocrates
