= Primus =

Primus (Latin, 'first') may refer to:

== Arts, entertainment and media ==
=== Fictional entities ===
- Primus (DC Comics), a character appearing in comic books published by DC Comics
- Primus (Marvel Comics), the name of several characters appearing in comic books published by Marvel Comics
- Primus, a character in the novel Stardust and its film adaptation
- Primus, a planet in The New Adventures of He-Man
- Primus, the creator and god of the Transformers
- Primus, a godlike being embodying law and order from Dungeons & Dragons

=== Other uses in arts, entertainment and media ===
- Primus (band), an American rock band
- PRIMUS (journal), a quarterly journal of undergraduate mathematics education
- Primus (TV series), 1971–1972

== Businesses and brands ==
- Primus, a brand of keys by Schlage
- Primus AB, a Swedish manufacturer of portable cooking devices and outdoor stoves
  - Primus stove, a pressurized-burner kerosene stove
- Primus beer, by Bralima Brewery in the Democratic Republic of the Congo
- Primus Telecommunications Group, Inc., now HC2 Holdings
- Primus Canada, Canadian internet service provider owned by Distributel
- Primus Telecommunications (Australia), a subsidiary of Vocus Communications

== People ==
- Primus (name), including a list of people with the name
- Pope Primus of Alexandria, pope and patriarch of Alexandria 106–118
- Saint Primus (died c. 297), Christian martyr
- Marcus Antonius Primus 1st century Roman general

== Other uses ==
- Primus of the Scottish Episcopal Church, the church's presiding bishop
- Primus (cycling team), a Polish women's road-racing team
- Primus Peak, a mountain in the U.S. state of Washington
- Patient Reported Outcome Indices for Multiple Sclerosis (PRIMUS), a medical research tool
- Adler Primus, a 1930s German small family car
- CAIGA Primus 150, a Chinese light aircraft
- Honeywell Primus, a range of glass cockpits by Honeywell Aerospace
- SSPH Primus, a Singaporean self-propelled howitzer

== See also ==
- Prima (disambiguation)
- Prime (disambiguation)
- Secundus (disambiguation)
