= Harpactocrates gredensis =

Scientific classification
- Kingdom: Animalia
- Phylum: Arthropoda
- Subphylum: Chelicerata
- Class: Arachnida
- Order: Araneae
- Infraorder: Araneomorphae
- Family: Dysderidae
- Genus: Harpactocrates
- Species: H. gredensis

Binomial name
- Harpactocrates gredensis Ferrández, 1986

Species of spider

Harpactocrates gredensis is a species of arachnid in the infraorder Araneomorphae, family Dysderidae, and genus Harpactocrates. It was described by Ferrández in 1986.

It is distributed in Spain. The male's body measures approximately 8–9.8 millimeters in length, and the female's measures 9.2–14 millimeters.
