= Benjamin Dill =

American Confederate editor

Benjamin F. Dill

Benjamin Franklin Dill (1814-1866) was one of the most wanted Confederates during the American Civil War. As editor of the pro-Confederate Memphis Appeal, Dill's moniker was "The Greatest Rebel of them All." General Ulysses Grant and General William T. Sherman chased Dill "across four states, yet they could not silence the 'Voice of the Confederacy.'"

Dill's newspaper, The Memphis Appeal was the most notorious during the American Civil War. Upon threat of being captured in Memphis, on June 6, 1862, the presses and plates were loaded into a boxcar and moved to Grenada, Mississippi. When that region was threatened, the Appeal journeyed to Jackson, Mississippi, then Meridian, Mississippi, then Atlanta, Georgia, then Montgomery, Alabama. When General James H. Wilson's Raid approached Montgomery, Dill took his operation to Columbus, Georgia. When General James H. Wilson captured Columbus on April 16, 1865, his men finally captured Dill and the Appeal. General James H. Wilson remarked, ""Have we caught the old fox at last? Well I'll be damned!".

Publication resumed in Memphis on November 5, 1865. Dill died two months later.
