= Alice Y. Ting =

American chemist

Alice Yen-Ping Ting
- 丁燕萍
- Born: 1974 (age 51–52); Taiwan
- Education: Harvard University (BSc); UC Berkeley (PhD); UCSD (Post-doc)
- Known for: Development of proximity labeling systems, such as APEX, TurboID, LOV-Turbo, TransitID, LaccID, and FlexID
- Scientific career
- Fields: Chemical biology Protein engineering
- Workplaces: Stanford University; Chan Zuckerberg Biohub; Massachusetts Institute of Technology
- Doctoral advisor: Peter G. Schultz
- Other academic advisors: E.J. Corey; Roger Y. Tsien

Alice Yen-Ping Ting (Chinese: 丁燕萍) is a Taiwanese-American chemist. She is a professor of genetics, biology, and chemistry at Stanford University. She is also a Chan Zuckerberg Biohub investigator and a member of the National Academy of Sciences.

== Early life and education ==
Alice Ting was born in Taiwan and immigrated to the United States when she was three years old. She was raised in Texas and attended the Texas Academy of Mathematics and Science (TAMS). As a high school student, Ting participated in the Research Science Institute at MIT. She received her B.S. in chemistry from Harvard University in 1996, working with Nobel laureate E.J. Corey. She completed her Ph.D. with Peter G. Schultz at the University of California, Berkeley in 2000.

Ting completed her postdoctoral fellowship with 2008 Nobel Laureate Roger Y. Tsien at the University of California, San Diego.

== Career ==
Ting joined the MIT Chemistry Department in 2002 where she was the Ellen Swallow Richards Professor until 2016. In 2016, she moved to Stanford University, Departments of Genetics, of Biology, and, by courtesy, of Chemistry. Her research harnesses the power of directed evolution and synthetic organic chemistry to develop novel methods for studying the cell. She has received a number of awards, including a 2008 NIH Director's Pioneer Award, a 2010 Arthur C. Cope Scholar Award from the American Chemical Society, an NIH Transformative R01 Award (both 2013 and 2018), the McKnight Technological Innovations in Neuroscience Award, the Technology Review TR35 Award, the Sloan Foundation Research Fellowship, the Office of Naval Research Young Investigator Award, the Camille Dreyfus Teacher-Scholar Award, and the Vilcek Prize for Creative Promise in Biomedical Science in 2012. Ting has been an investigator of the Chan Zuckerberg Biohub since 2017. She delivered the John Kendrew Lecture at the MRC Laboratory of Molecular Biology in 2022. Ting was elected as a member of the National Academy of Sciences in 2023. In October of 2025, Ting was elected to be a member of the National Academy of Medicine.

=== Research ===
Ting and her lab are credited with developing several influential techniques, some of which have been broadly adopted by academic and industrial researchers across the world. Proximity labeling (PL) is a method for discovery of molecules that reside within a few nanometers (1-5 nm) of a designated molecule of interest, within living cells or organisms. The technique involves fusing a promiscuous labeling enzyme to the molecule of interest and then adding a small-molecule substrate that enables the enzyme to covalently tag any (protein or RNA) molecule within its immediate vicinity. PL is a powerful method for elucidating signaling networks, dissecting molecular function, and potentially discovering novel disease genes. Ting's laboratory has developed three widely used enzymes for PL; all were engineered using directed evolution: the peroxidase APEX2, and the biotin ligases TurboID and miniTurbo.

In addition, Ting and her lab developed monovalent streptavidin, site-specific biotinylation in mammalian cells, small monovalent quantum dots for single molecule imaging, APEX2 as a genetic tag for electron microscopy (analogous to green fluorescent protein but visible by electron microscopy), split horseradish peroxidase for visualization of synapses in vivo, FLARE (fast light- and activity-regulated expression) for gaining genetic access to activated neural ensembles, SPARK (specific protein association tool giving transcriptional readout with rapid kinetics) for transcriptional readout of protein-protein interactions, and PRIME (probe incorporation mediated by enzymes) – a protein labeling technique that enables scientists to capitalize on the brightness, photostability, small size, and chemical diversity of small-molecule probes as an alternative to green fluorescent protein.

In December 2024, Ting and her team introduced a groundbreaking synthetic receptor named Programmable Antigen-gated G protein-coupled Engineered Receptor (PAGER). This innovation is built around G protein-coupled receptors and has demonstrated versatility in controlling neuronal activity, triggering immune responses, and delivering therapeutic treatments in laboratory settings. The development of PAGER signifies a substantial advancement in the ability to program cell activity, with potential applications spanning from immunotherapy to neurology.

In 2025, Ting was a corresponding author on a study in Nature Chemical Biology. The article reports the directed evolution of LaccID for cell surface proximity labeling and electron microscopy.

== Honors & Awards ==
Alice Y. Ting has received numerous honors and awards in her career, including:

- Elected Academician, Academia Sinica (2026)
- Elected Member, National Academy of Medicine (2025)
- Honorary Fellow, Chinese Chemical Society (2025)
- Honorary Doctorate, Icahn School of Medicine at Mt. Sinai (2024)
- Elected Member, National Academy of Sciences (2023)
- NIH Director's Transformative Research Award, National Institute of Health (2018)
- Chan Zuckerberg Biohub Investigator, Chan Zuckerberg Biohub (2017)
- Professor of Genetics, Biology, and by courtesy, Chemistry, Standford University (2016)
- Professor of Chemistry, Massachusetts Institute of Technology (2014)
- NIH Director's Transformative Research Award, National Institute of Health (2013)
- HHMI Collaborative Innovation Award, Howard Hughes Medical Institute (2012)
- Prize for Creative Promise in Biomedical Science, Vilcek Foundation (2012)
- Ellen Swallow Richards Chair, Massachusetts Institute of Technology (2011)
- Arthur C. Cope Scholar Award, American Chemical Society (2010)
- Eli Lilly Award in Biological Chemistry, American Chemical Society (2010)
- NIH Director's Pioneer Award, National Institute of Health (2008)
- Buck-Whitney Award, American Chemical Society (2007)
- Associate Professor of Chemistry, Massachusetts Institute of Technology (2007)
- Camille Dreyfus Teacher-Scholar Award, Dreyfus Foundation (2006)
- Technology Review TR35 Award, Massachusetts Institute of Technology (2006)
- Alfred P. Sloan Foundation Research Fellowship, Sloan Foundation (2005)
- McKnight Technological Innovations in Neuroscience Award, McKnight Foundation (2005)
- EJLB Foundation Scholar Research Program Award, EJLB Foundation (2003)
- NIH K22 Career Development Award, National Institute of Health (2003)
- Young Investigator Award, Office of Naval Research (2003)
- Camille and Henry Dreyfus New Faculty Award, Dreyfus Foundation (2002)
- Pfizer-Laubach Career Development Chair, Massachusetts Institute of Technology (2002)
- Assistant Professor of Chemistry, Massachusetts Institute of Technology (2002)

=== Publicly Available Lectures ===
- "Proteomics and proximity labeling in neuroscience." Virtual Workshop on Proximity Labeling (2020)
- "Computational design of a proximity labeling enzyme (FlexID) for mapping spatial proteomes and interactomes in living cells." Keynote Lecture, Rosettacon (2025)
- "Proximity labeling for the study of endogenous protein and RNA in living cells, with high spatial and temporal accuracy." Keynote Lecture, American Society for Cell Biology (2022)
