= Priming =

Priming may refer to:

- Priming (agriculture), a form of seed planting preparation, in which seeds are soaked before planting
- Priming (immunology), a process occurring when a specific antigen is presented to naive lymphocytes causing them to differentiate either into armed effector cells or into memory cells
- Priming (media), a cognitive process in which media information increases temporarily the accessibility of knowledge units in the memory of an individual
- Priming (microbiology), the effect that nutrients have on the rate of organic matter decomposition.
- Priming (psychology), a process in which the processing of a target stimulus is aided or altered by the presentation of a previously presented stimulus
- Priming (steam locomotive), a harmful condition in which water is carried over from the boiler of a steam locomotive
- Priming (structural) in psycholinguistics, a form of positive priming that induces a tendency to repeat or more easily process a sentence that is similar in structure to one previously presented
- Priming beta-ketosynthase in chemistry, a domain of polyketide synthases with a thiol group on a cysteine side-chain
- The process by which a pump is filled with fluid and made able to operate
- Priming the pump or economic stimulus, attempts to use monetary or fiscal policy to stimulate the economy
- Priming sugar or glucose, a simple monosaccharide found in plants

== See also ==
- Primer (disambiguation)
- Intertrial priming (psychology)
- Response priming (psychology)
- Negative priming (psychology)
