= Geneva Securities Convention =

Unidroit convention on substantive rules for intermediated securities
- Signed: 9 October 2009
- Location: Geneva, Switzerland
- Effective: Not effective
- Condition: 3 ratifications
- Signatories: 1 (Bangladesh)
- Ratifiers: None
- Depositary: International Institute for the Unification of Private Law
- Languages: English and French

The Unidroit convention on substantive rules for intermediated securities, also known as the Geneva Securities Convention, was adopted on 9 October 2009. It has been signed by only one of the 40 negotiating States (Bangladesh), but not entered into force. The official commentary was published in 2012.

This convention adopted under the aegis of the International Institute for the Unification of Private Law (Unidroit) complements the "Hague Securities Convention" adopted on 17 January 2002 by the Hague Conference on Private International Law, which entered into force in 2017.

== Context ==
=== "Dematerialisation" and the development of "intermediated securities" ===
As for the Hague Securities Convention, the Geneva Securities Convention concerns only securities that are not traded under a paper form. These securities, sometimes called "dematerialised securities", constitute in many States, more than 99% of the securities issued by listed companies on the so-called "regulated markets".

The move towards "dematerialization" started partially in the United States in the late sixties, and has been generalised in France during the eighties, followed by the rest of Europe during the years 2000. Today, only the United States and the United Kingdom, due to more ancient and more extended infrastructures, maintain a substantial minority of securities under a paper form. The dematerialisation of securities incurs that most securities, even though they are sometimes characterised as "bearer securities", do not take any more the form of paper forms held at home by the investor or deposited in a vault with a bank. Instead of this, these securities take the form of a credit, that is to say a simple book entry written on an account statement characterised as "securities account".

These securities accounts may be opened:

- Either directly with the issuer, in its own books ("dematerialised securities in pure registered form"),
- or, more often, with an intermediary, which in most countries must be licensed in order to open securities accounts to its clients. In most EU Member States, these intermediaries are, either credit institutions, or investment firms governed respectively by the banking directive and by the Markets in Financial Instruments Directive (MiFID). When it is "maintained" by an intermediary, the security is characterised, either as "simply registered dematerialised security" where the name of the final investor is known by the issuer, or as "bearer dematerialised security", where the name of the investor is not known by the issuer. In the latter case, the final investor will be able to participate to shareholder or bondholder General Meetings organised by the issuer only if it gets from the intermediary a certificate providing that it is the right shareholder or bondholder.

=== Distinction between "substantive right" and "intrinsic right" ===
The Unidroit convention focuses on the harmonisation of the sole rules governing "substantive rights", as opposed to "intrinsic rights".

This distinction characterises "intrinsic rights" as the rights stemming from the issue of the security (voting rights, perception of dividends, ... as provided under company law), whereas "substantive rights", are characterised as the rights resulting from the incorporation of the latter intrinsic rights in the securities (right to dispose and to acquire without the consent of the other shareholders or bondholders): these so-called "substantive rights" are closely linked to the "rights in rem", which itself pertains to financial law, and, if not, to civil law. Making it short, "intrinsic rights" focus the content, whereas "substantive rights" focus on the external envelope constituted by the security. The Geneva Securities Convention, is thus limited to the external aspect of the security, that is to say the way securities are handled, in particular in case of acquisition (purchase, securities borrowing, receiving a collateral on securities) and in case of disposition (sell, security lending, constitution of a collateral on the security).

The underlying idea is that, while "intrinsic law" is intangible, since it is tributary to the legislation under which the issuer is incorporated, "substantive law" is, on the contrary, quite volatile, since it is subject to the place where the security is localised and/or traded. This distinction is ancient and draws back to the time where foreign investors used to repatriate paper securities subscribed with issuers incorporated under a different constituency. The title transfer of these securities (whether as a final transfer, or as a collateral) outside their constituency of origin could therefore be submitted to a law different from the law of the issuer: either the law convened by the parties (lex contractus), or, more often, the law of the place where the securities where located at the time of the transfer (lex rei sitae). Such distinction between "intrinsic rights" subject to issuer law and "substantive rights" subject either to the "lex contractus" or to the "lex rei sitae", is still valid in the context of dematerialization of securities and has been undertaken in the Hague Securities Convention concerning conflicts of laws, which in particular, provides for a "lex contractus" solution.

=== Distinction between "conceptual approach" and "functional approach" ===
Thus, Unidroit has chosen to harmonise only a part of the "substantive law" on securities. Indeed, certain proprietary aspects concerning securities are governed in too different ways by the negotiating states. This is in particular the case of what is considered to be the "heart of proprietary law", that is to say the question whether an investor that has "deposited" a security with an intermediary continues to exercise on such deposited security a right in rem or if its right is transformed, as from the deposit, into a simple claim. Such distinction becomes crucial when an insolvency procedure is open against the intermediary. In countries where the first interpretation prevails, the investor shall dispose of a right to "rivindicate" (claim as one's own) which will allow him a speedy recover of the securities. In countries where the second interpretation prevails (the US and, to a certain extent the recourse to trust deposits in common law countries), the investor would only dispose of a right of claim, that will oblige him, except when the contrary is specified, to share with other creditors of the insolvent intermediary the product of the winding up of the intermediary in prorate of the value of the security.

This second interpretation does not comfort the investor, even when it is backed by experienced lawyers (see case of Banco Santander's securities deposited with Lehman Brothers). Although one is not aware of any case law precedent where a common law court pushed this interpretation until its ultimate consequence, Unidroit has chosen to remain neutral concerning any characterisation of the ownership regime. This neutral approach is defined by Unidroit as the "functional approach", since it focuses only on certain functions of the "ownership regime", in opposition to the "conceptual approach" which covers all proprietary aspects.

== Matters covered by the Unidroit Convention ==
The Unidroit Convention tackles the following matters:

1. the rights of the investor with respect to the intermediary (except for the right of ownership)
2. the methods of registration of the book entry-securities
3. the diligences of the intermediary concerning the control of the integrity of the securities
4. the simplified methods of collateralisation between account holders and intermediaries.

=== Rights of the investor with respect to the intermediary ===
The rights of the investor with respect to the intermediary retained are

1. right of the investor to instruct the intermediary to dispose the securities,
2. right to choose the method of detention of the securities, for example the right to require that the security be maintained on a separate account on behalf of the investor rather than on a collective account opened on behalf of the intermediary ("omnibus account").
3. right to be able to exercise the intrinsic rights, but without it being specified whether the intermediary is only committed not to impede the exercise of these rights (rights to vote) or has in addition the obligation to facilitate the exercise of these rights (for example while serving as a channel of distribution of the paid dividends by the issuer).

These rights of the investor constitute an enforceable minimum between the parties to the convention, which could be enriched by national provisions.

=== Methods of registration of the book entry securities ===
Registration methods are subject to the principle of "visibility":

1. "Debit/credit", without it being specified that a debit necessarily involves a credit.
2. "Identification", or "ear-marking", technique consisting in annotating a security line by means of a code reporting that the security was the subject of a right for a third party, whether it is a taking of guarantee on these securities, or by means of a right to compensation with securities of a similar category.
3. "Control agreement", American technique seldom used in Europe, consisting in connecting an "ear-marking" to a convention that has been additionally published.

Moreover, this limitation of the registration methods is supplemented by rules limiting the possibilities of reversal of these book entries even in the event of bankruptcy ("effectiveness"). The aim of this harmonisation of the registration methods is to create a bridge between European directive 98/26 on payment and securities settlement systems and the less integrated practices of non-European countries. Indeed, the directive 98/26 introduces since 1998, concepts very close to the concepts of book-entries("entry in the system"), of limitation of reversals ("irrevocability") and of effectiveness ("finality").

=== Diligences of the intermediary concerning the control of the integrity ===
The convention envisages a number of obligations of the intermediary consisting in particular in the obligation for the intermediary to reflect with its own intermediary as many securities of the same issue, as it has credited in its own books either to the benefit of its customers or for itself. This obligation of exact "reporting" exact, also known under the name of "control of integrity" is intended to limit the risks of artificial creation of securities by simple erroneous entries.

Indeed, except rare exceptions, any chain of dematerialised securities contains at least four degrees: (1) the issuer, (2) the Central Securities Depository of the issuer ("CSD"), (3) the final intermediary and (4) the investor. In each subscription of a new security, each one of these actors forwards the security to the immediate lower level by a debit of its account and a credit of the account of its correspondent.

Within a cross-border framework, i.e. when the security is issued by an issuer under a different law than of the law of the residence of the investor, additional levels interpose between the CSD and the final intermediary. According to their position in the chain, these additional intermediaries can be described respectively as "home custodian" (intermediary of the same nationality than the CSD of the issuer), the "regional custodian" (intermediary specialised in shunting between "home custodian" and "global custodian") and finally the "global custodian", the latter generally confounded with the final intermediary. This downward process related to the subscription requires, an exact replication of the debits and of the credits of the securities between each link of the intermediation chain. In other words, whenever an intermediary credits the account of its customer, it must itself ask to its own intermediary that it has accordingly debited its own account opened with it.

This obligation "of integrity" also applies to the horizontal registration processes, when the security is yielded on the secondary market or, to the ascending processes, when the security is sub-deposited by the final intermediary with another intermediary. Indeed, after having credited the account with its customer/ final investor at the time of the acquisition of the security, the final intermediary ("global custodian") can, if its customer permits it, "sub-deposit" the security to an intermediary specialised in the optimum management of the category securities in question. This latter profession is known under the name of "prime broker". Here too, the obligation of "integrity "or of" "exact reporting" of the debits and of the credits applies to each level of the holding chain of the securities, in such manner that no security can be credited at the same time on two different accounts.

=== Simplified methods of collateralisation between account holders and intermediaries ===
These provisions aim to allow recognition between all parties to the convention of the two main collateralisation methods applicable to securities: on the one hand, the "title transfer guarantees" (such as "repurchase agreement" or "buy to sell back") and on the other hand, "hypothecation guarantees" "such as "pledge" of securities, and to a certain extent "security lending". Furthermore, these provisions require parties to allow their constitution and their execution in a simplified form.

== The critics addressed to the Unidroit Convention ==
The critics addressed to the Unidroit Convention stem mainly from the inner circle of the negotiators of this Convention. Like all the diplomatic conferences of Unidroit, negotiators were composed of delegations from the participating States as well as of non-governmental organisations. One could thus observe during the "diplomatic" conferences of 2008 and of 2009 a strong mobilisation of the Anglo-Saxon delegations for a "functional-contractual" approach and conversely a mobilisation of several Member States of the European Union for a "functional-systemic" approach (France, Germany, Italy and Spain). Switzerland and the European Commission, for their part, contributed to facilitating the adoption of a compromise text. The final version of the Unidroit Convention gives thus seemingly reason to the partisans of the systemic-functional approach, while making prevail, in practice, the functional-contractual approach supported by the Anglo-Saxon negotiators.

=== A contractual approach of American inspiration ===
The functional approach led by Unidroit supposed total neutrality with respect to property rights. However, insofar as property right concerning securities no longer exists strictly speaking in the United States, not referring to property rights in the Unidroit convention is equivalent to referring to the contractual rights that have substituted to it in the United States.

==== The source of inspiration: Article 8 of the UCC ====
The ownership aspects concerning securities are governed in the United States by Article 8 of the Uniform Commercial Code (UCC). This Article 8, actually a text of about thirty pages, has undergone an important recasting in 1994. Since 1994, Article 8 of the UCC considers that the majority of the dematerialised securities that are registered on an account with intermediaries are only reflections of their respective initial issue registered by the two American central securities depositories, respectively the Depository Trust Company (DTC) for the securities issued by corporates and the Federal reserve for the securities issued by the Treasury Department. In this centralised system, the title transfer of the securities does not take place at the time of the registration on the account of the investor, but within the systems managed by the DTC and/or by the Federal Reserve. This centralisation would not be shocking if it were also accompanied by a centralised register of the investors/owners of the securities, like what is done today in Sweden and in Finland(so-called "transparent systems"). But the DTC and the FED hold no individual register of the transfers of property, so that the possibility for an investor of proving the property of its securities relies entirely on the good replication of the transfer recorded by the DTC and FED at the lower tiers of the holding chain of the securities.

Each one of these links is composed respectively of an account provider (or intermediary) and of an account holder the latter being itself, except for the final investor, account provider of another account holder located at the lower link. The rights created through these links, are purely contractual claims: these rights are of two kinds:

- for the links where the account holder is itself an account provider at a lower tier, the right on the security during the time where it is credited there is characterised as a "securities entitlement", which is an "ad hoc" concept invented in 1994: i.e. designating a claim that will enable the account holder to take part to a prorate distribution in the event of bankruptcy of its account provider.

- For the last link of the chain, in which the account holder is at the same time the final investor, its "security entitlement" is enriched by the "intrinsic" rights defined by the issuer: right to receive dividends or interests and, possibly, right to take part in the general meetings, when that was laid down in the account agreement concluded with the account provider. The combination of these reduced substantive rights and of these variable intrinsic rights is characterised by article 8 of the UCC as a "beneficial interest".

This decomposition of the rights organised by Article 8 of the UCC results in preventing the investor to revindicate the security in case of bankruptcy of the account provider, that is to say the possibility to claim the security as its own asset, without being obliged to share it at its prorate value with the other creditors of the account provider. As a consequence, it also prevents the investor, to assert its securities at the upper level of the holding chain, either up to the DTC or up to a sub-custodian. Such a "security entitlement", unlike a normal ownership right, is no longer enforceable "erga omnes" to any person supposed to have the security in its custody. The "security entitlement" is a mere relative right, therefore a contractual right. Furthermore, this re-characterisation of the proprietary right into a simple contractual right enables the account provider, to "re-use" the security without necessarily being obliged to ask for the authorisation of the investor, in particular within the framework of temporary operations such as security lending, option to repurchase, buy to sell back or repurchase agreement. Last, but not least, it stumps the distinction between the downward holding chain which traces the way in which the security was subscribed by the investor and the horizontal and/or ascending chains which trace the way in which the security has been transferred or sub-deposited.

The UK law on securities recognises, as a matter of principle, the property of the final investor on all the "substantive rights" pertaining to a security. Nevertheless, the generalised practice of characterising the deposit as a "trust" at every tier of the holding chain prevents the holder of an account maintained by a British intermediary characterised as "trustee" to assert its securities at a level upper to its account provider. In the latter case the beneficiary of the trust agreement, becomes itself a "beneficial owner" with no possibility to reflect this ownership in its balance sheet. This situation leads in practice to the same effects as the "contractualisation" of the "substantive" rights incurred in the US by Article 8 of the UCC. Accordingly, the United Kingdom and most other countries of Common law felt no difficulty of being brought into line with the American contractual approach.

To summarise, by being based exclusively on the binomial "account holder"/account provider", and while forbidding the holder of the account to rivindicate the security at a higher tier of the holding chain, even where the latter would be "a sub-custodian" of its own "account provider", the Unidroit Convention makes the American contractual approach prevail and does not respect the principle of neutrality which had fostered the choice of the functional approach.

==== Interactions with company law ====
The Unidroit convention states, in its preamble, the principle of neutrality with respect to company law. Several negotiating States had in particular asked:

- On the one hand that the issuer of a foreign security are not required to adapt theirs "corporate actions" (dividends or interests, notices convening to General meetings, etc.) to the laws of the countries where the intermediaries and/or the investor are located;
- On the other hand, that the exercise of the intrinsic rights could not be affected by the arrangement of substantive law set up by the Unidroit convention.

These countries won the case on certain aspects of the first request, with the last sentence of Article 29.1 stipulating, in a sibylline way, that signatory States are not required to compel their issuers to make sure "that all such securities be issued on terms that permit them to be held through intermediaries". Nevertheless, for the remainder, signatory States will have to compel their transmitters to recognise as intrinsic right holders, persons which, under the law of the issuer, would have been regarded as shareholders or bondholders.

Thus, the "contractualisation" of substantive law, while making it possible for the legislation of the intermediaries to regard the latter as holders of a "secured interest" accompanied by certain rights such as the right to vote, permits intermediaries to take part in the shareholders or bondholders meetings without the express consent of the investor. Admittedly, in practice, the US legislation envisages procedures enabling the genuine investor to obtain a "mandate" ("proxy") from their respective final intermediary in order to exercise the rights to vote on behalf of the latter. Nevertheless, the international recognition of such a US practice consisting in reversing the burden of the proof of the "titularity" of the voting rights has a considerable impact on the actual exercise of the voting rights in General meetings of large non US issuers that have recently broaden their capital to foreign investors. The States that will sign the Unidroit convention will thus facilitate the control of their national issuers by intermediaries incorporated under US law.
