= Prime (surname) =

Prime is a surname found primarily in the United Kingdom and its former colonies.

== People ==
- Anita Prime, New Zealand singer-songwriter
- Audrey Prime (1915–2001), British trade unionist
- Barry Prime (born 1954), British swimmer
- Benjamin Prime (1733–1791), American poet, essayist, and songwriter
- Dalvanius Prime (1948–2002), New Zealand entertainer and songwriter
- Geoffrey Prime (born 1938), British convicted spy
- George Prime (born 1953), politician from the island of Grenada
- Harry Prime (1920–2017), American singer
- James Prime (1960–2025), Scottish musician
- Jimmy Prime (born 1993), Canadian rapper
- John Prime (1549–1596), English clergyman
- Justin Prime (born 1986), Dutch DJ
- Leopold Prime (1884–1923), New Zealand cricketer
- Nathaniel Prime (1768–1840), American broker and banker
- Nathaniel Prime, American officer during the Civil War
- Samuel I. Prime (1812–1885), American clergyman, traveller, and writer
- Spencer G. Prime (1851–1926), New York politician
- Temple Prime (1832–1903), American amateur conchologist and genealogist

== Fictional ==
- Denise and Nicholas Prime, French names of Dilys and Norman Price from the Fireman Sam franchise
- Optimus Prime, from the Transformers franchise

== See also ==
- Prime (disambiguation)
