= Doughboy (character) =

- Doughboy as depicted in Captain America #209 (May 1977). Art by Jack Kirby

Publication information
- Publisher: Marvel Comics
- First appearance: Captain America #209 (May 1977)
- Created by: Jack Kirby

In-story information
- Abilities: Superhuman strength, durability, and agility; Malleability

Doughboy is a fictional character appearing in American comic books published by Marvel Comics. He is a dough-like artificial lifeform who was created by and often appears in association with Arnim Zola.

Doughboy has made limited appearances in media outside comics, with Grant Moninger voicing him in The Avengers: Earth's Mightiest Heroes.

== Publication history ==
Doughboy first appeared in Captain America #209 (May 1977), and was created by Jack Kirby.

== Fictional character biography ==
Doughboy is an artificial lifeform created by Arnim Zola as his servant who normally assumes a blob-like shape with long rubbery arms and stalk-like legs. Doughboy is employed by Arnim Zola against Captain America in Zola's first encounter with the Captain.

Zola later fuses Doughboy with Primus, who takes control of Doughboy and conspires with Baron Zemo against Captain America. Several years later, Doughboy is separated from Primus and battles Crossbones when he enters Zola's castle. Doughboy assists in Zola's rescue of the Red Skull and Skeleton Crew, taking the form of a Quinjet. Doughboy next captures Captain America and Thor on Zola's orders, only to be destroyed by Thor. Doughboy later resurfaces and battles the Thunderbolts in China.

== Powers and abilities ==
Doughboy has a malleable body that enables him to fly, shapeshift, and absorb matter to grow in size. However, he possesses limited intelligence and is largely incapable of acting without orders.

== In other media ==
- Doughboy appears as a boss in Iron Man and X-O Manowar in Heavy Metal.
- Doughboy appears in The Avengers: Earth's Mightiest Heroes, with vocal effects provided by Grant Moninger. This version is a member of Baron Zemo's Masters of Evil.
- Doughboy appears in Avengers Assemble. This version is from another dimension, possesses a more humanoid appearance, and is part of a species of Doughboys.
