= Kut (surname) =

Kut is a Turkish surname. Notable people with the surname include:

- Burak Kut (born 1973), Turkish pop singer and songwriter
- Halil Kut (1881–1957), Ottoman military commander and politician
- Şule Kut, Turkish academic
