= UNIDROIT =

Intergovernmental legal organization

International Institute for the Unification of Private Law
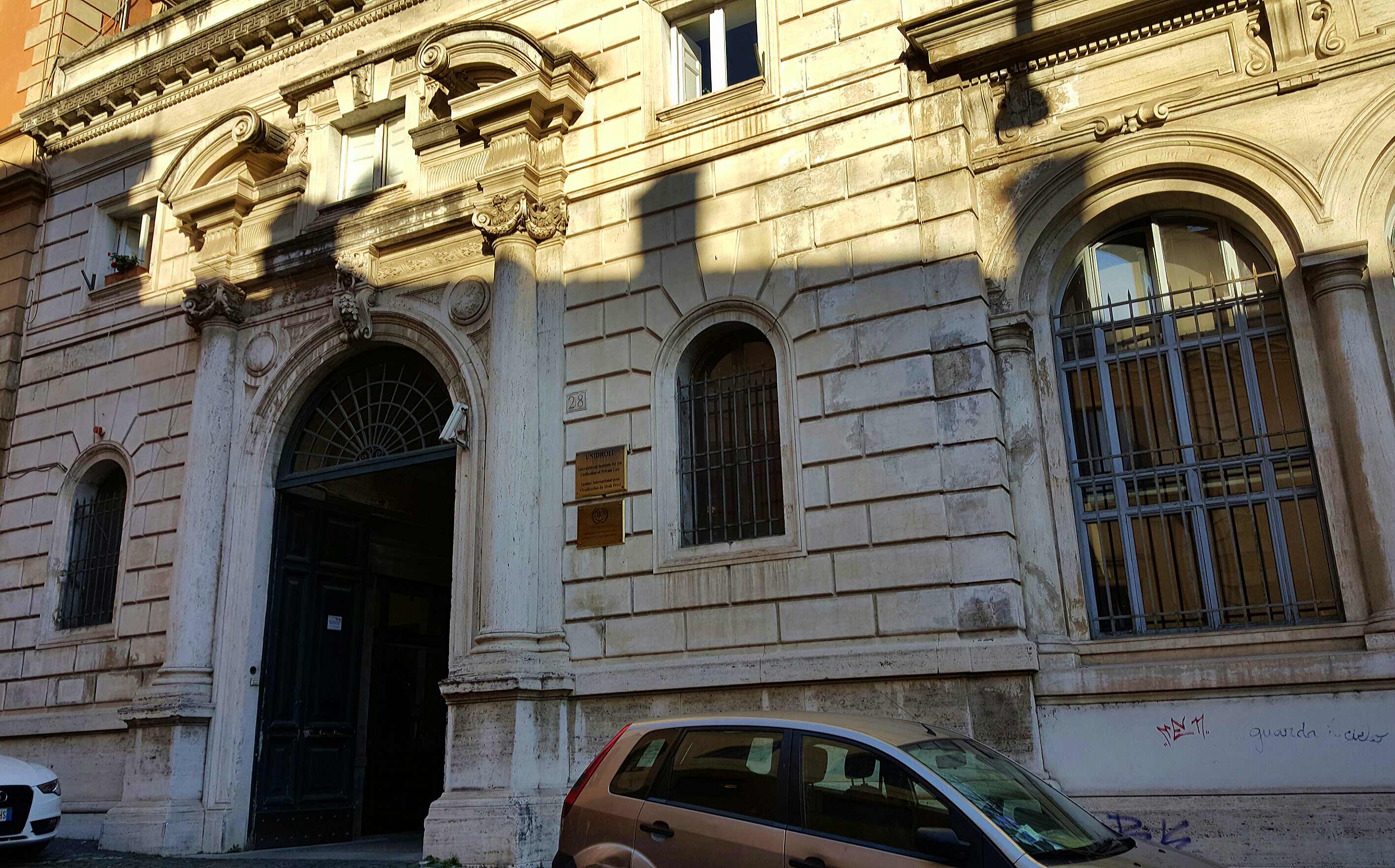
- Abbreviation: UNIDROIT
- Formation: 1926
- Type: intergovernmental Organization
- Headquarters: Rome, Italy
- Members: 65 States (2023)
- Official language: English, French, Spanish, Italian, German
- Secretary General: Professor Ignacio Tirado
- President of the Governing Council: Professor Maria Chiara Malaguti
- Website: https://www.unidroit.org/

UNIDROIT (formally, the International Institute for the Unification of Private Law; French: Institut international pour l'unification du droit privé) is an intergovernmental organization whose objective is to harmonize private international law across countries through uniform rules, international conventions, and the production of model laws, sets of principles, guides and guidelines. Established in 1926 as part of the League of Nations, it was reestablished in 1940 following the League's dissolution through a multilateral agreement, the UNIDROIT Statute. As of 2023 UNIDROIT has 65 member states.

UNIDROIT has prepared multiple conventions (treaties), but has also developed soft law instruments. An example are the UNIDROIT Principles of International Commercial Contracts. Distinctly different from the Convention on the International Sale of Goods (CISG) adopted by UNCITRAL, the UNIDROIT Principles do not apply as a matter of law, but only when chosen by the parties as their contractual regime.

== Seat ==
The seat of UNIDROIT is in Rome, Italy, between via Nazionale and via Panisperna (address: via Panisperna, 28), occupying the Villa Aldobrandini, a 17th-century princely villa that borders the Pontifical University of Saint Thomas Aquinas, Angelicum, to the south.

== Working methods ==
=== Preliminary stage ===
Once a subject has been included in UNIDROIT's Work Programme, the Secretariat is responsible for preparing a feasibility study and a preliminary comparative law analysis to evaluate the relevance and feasibility of the proposed reform. This study will be presented to the Governing Council for review, and if considered appropriate, a committee will be established to draft a preliminary project for a convention or other legal instruments.

=== Intergovernmental negotiation stage ===
A preliminary draft instrument prepared by the study group is presented to the Governing Council for approval and guidance on the next steps. If it is a preliminary draft Convention, the Council usually requests the Secretariat to form a committee of governmental experts to finalize a draft Convention for submission to a Diplomatic Conference. If an alternative to a preliminary draft Convention is deemed suitable for the committee, the Council authorizes its publication and dissemination by UNIDROIT.

Participation in UNIDROIT committees is open to representatives of all Member States, and additional States, international organizations, and professional associations may be invited as observers. The finalized draft Convention by the committee is submitted to the Governing Council for approval. If it reflects a consensus among the participating States and has a good chance of adoption at a Diplomatic Conference, the Council authorizes its transmission to the Conference. The Diplomatic Conference, convened by a UNIDROIT Member State, adopts the draft Convention as an international Convention.

=== Co-operation with other international organisations ===
UNIDROIT maintains cooperative relationships with various international organizations, both intergovernmental and non-governmental, through cooperation agreements at the inter-Secretariat level. The Hague Conference on Private International Law, UNIDROIT, and the United Nations Commission on International Trade Law (UNCITRAL), known as "the three sisters," are the primary private-law formulating agencies. UNIDROIT's expertise in the international unification of law also leads to commissioned work for other organizations, including comparative law studies and drafting Conventions that serve as the foundation for international instruments in those organizations.

=== Network of correspondents ===
To fulfill its statutory objectives, UNIDROIT recognizes the critical importance of having access to current and comprehensive legal information from diverse jurisdictions. However, obtaining such information can be challenging. Therefore, UNIDROIT establishes and maintains a network of correspondents comprising academic and practicing lawyers from both Member and non-Member States. These correspondents are appointed by the Governing Council and serve as valuable sources of legal knowledge, enabling UNIDROIT to stay informed about the state of the law in different countries.

== Membership ==
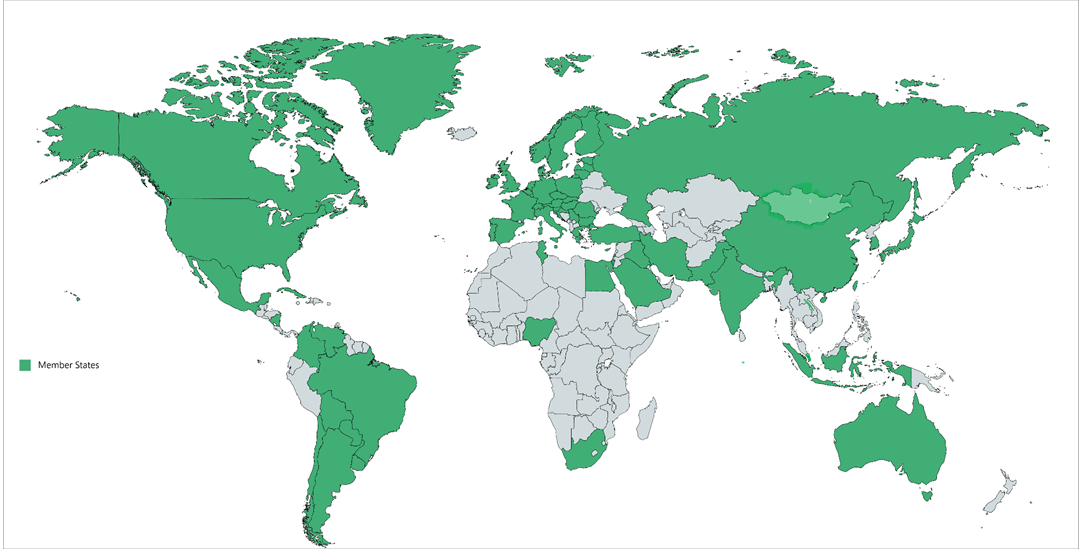
Mai 2023

States become members through acceding to its statute. The 65 members are:

Member country	Year of joining
Argentina	1972
Australia	1973
Austria	1948
Belgium	1940
Bolivia	1940
Brazil	1940
Bulgaria	1940
Canada	1968
Chile	1951
China	1986
Colombia	1940
Croatia	1996
Cuba	1940
Cyprus	1999
Czech Republic	1993
Denmark	1940
Egypt	1951
Estonia	2001
Finland	1940
France	1948
Germany	1940
Greece	1940
Holy See	1945
Hungary	1940
India	1950
Indonesia	2009
Iran	1951
Iraq	1973
Ireland	1940
Israel	1954
Italy	1940
Japan	1954
Latvia	2006
Lithuania	2007
Luxembourg	1951
Malta	1970
Mexico	1940
Mongolia	2023
Netherlands	1940
Nicaragua	1940
Nigeria	1964
Norway	1951
Pakistan	1964
Paraguay	1940
Poland	1979
Portugal	1949
Romania	1940
Russia (joined as Soviet Union)	1990
San Marino	1945
Saudi Arabia	2009
Serbia (joined as Federal Republic of Yugoslavia)	2001
Singapore	2023
Slovakia	1993
Slovenia	1995
South Africa	1971
South Korea	1981
Spain	1940
Sweden	1940
Switzerland	1940
Tunisia	1980
Turkey	1950
United Kingdom	1948
United States	1964
Uruguay	1940
Venezuela	1940

Ecuador was a member State of UNIDROIT from 1940 to 1964; Lebanon was a member State of UNIDROIT from 1958 to 1964 and Senegal was a member State from 1991 to 1997. Countries which have ceased to exist are former member states: Czechoslovakia, East Germany, United Arab Republic, and Yugoslavia.

== UNIDROIT instruments ==
=== Conventions ===
Unidroit has over the years prepared the following international Conventions, drawn up by Unidroit and adopted by diplomatic Conferences convened by member States of Unidroit:

- Convention relating to a Uniform Law on the International Sale of Goods (The Hague, 1964)
- Convention relating to a Uniform Law on the Formation of Contracts for the International Sale of Goods (The Hague, 1964)
- International Convention on Travel Contracts (Brussels, 1970)
- Convention providing a Uniform Law on the Form of an International Will (Washington, D.C., 1973)
- Convention on Agency in the International Sale of Goods (Geneva, 1983)
- UNIDROIT Convention on International Financial Leasing (Ottawa, 1988)
- UNIDROIT Convention on International Factoring (Ottawa, 1988)
- UNIDROIT Convention on Stolen or Illegally Exported Cultural Objects (Rome, 1995)
- Convention on International Interests in Mobile Equipment (Cape Town, 2001)
  - Protocol on Aircraft (2001)
  - Protocol on Railway Rolling Stock (2007)
  - Protocol on Space Assets (2012)
  - Protocol on Matters Specific to mining, Agricultural and Construction Equipment (2019)
- Geneva Securities Convention (Geneva, 2009)

UNIDROIT is depositary of two of its conventions: the Cape Town Convention (including its four protocols) as well as the Geneva Securities Convention.

For many years UNIDROIT prepared the background studies for international conventions that were subsequently finalized by other international organisations. To be noted among these, are the Convention on the Contract for the International Carriage of Goods by Road (CMR), finalized by the UN Economic Commission for Europe in 1956, and the United Nations Convention on the Liability of Operators of Transport Terminals in International Trade finalized by UNCITRAL in 1991.

=== Soft law ===
The institute has prepared non-binding rules to serve as a source of inspiration for members of the international community, such as model laws, principles and legal and contractual guides.

- the UNIDROIT Principles of International Commercial Contracts (1994, 2004, 2010 and 2016)
- the ALI / UNIDROIT Principles of Transnational Civil Procedure (in co-operation with the American Law Institute) (2004)
- the 2011 Model Provisions on State Ownership of Undiscovered Cultural Objects (in co-operation with UNESCO)
- the Principles on the Operation of Close-Out Netting Provisions (2013)
- the UNIDROIT/FAO/IFAD Legal Guide on Contract Farming (2015)
- the ELI/UNIDROIT Model European Rules of Civil Procedure (2020)
- UNIDROIT/ IFAD Legal Guide on agricultural land investment contracts (2021)

== Publications ==
The institute has been publishing the "Uniform Law Review" on a quarterly basis since 1996. It is a journal of UNIDROIT, published by the Oxford University Press. The working documents can be found on the UNIDROIT website.

The institute's library provides access to all UNIDROIT publications, as well as a collection of other texts and journals, comprising a database of 260,000 texts and currently featuring 450 periodicals. Remote access is available to the main electronic legal databases, such as Westlaw, EUR-Lex, and UNILEX, which include the United Nations Convention on Contracts for the International Sale of Goods and the UNIDROIT Principles of International Commercial Contract

== See also ==
- Rome I Regulation
- Uniform act
- United Nations Commission on International Trade Law (UNCITRAL)
- World Trade Organization
