= Primas (surname) =

Primas is a surname. Notable people with the name include:

- Francesca Primas, Italian astronomer
- Hans Primas (1928–2014), Swiss chemist
- Hugh Primas, 12th century Latin lyric poet in France
- Randy Primas (1949–2012), American politician
- Sophie Primas (born 1962), French politician
