= Secundus =

Secundus is the Latin word for "second." However, it also had the meaning of "favorable" or "lucky." It functions both as a proper name and a numeral title. It can refer to:

== People ==
=== Ancient Romans ===
- Pliny the Elder or Gaius Plinius Secundus (23-79)
- Pliny the Younger or Gaius Plinius Caecilius Secundus (61-c. 112)
- Lucius Pedanius Secundus (died 61), consul and praefectus urbi
- Pomponius Secundus, first century general and poet
- Quintus Petilius Secundus (c. 40-c. 65), legionary
- Quintus Pomponius Secundus, aristocrat and brother of Pomponius Secundus
- Titus Petronius Secundus (40-97), a prefect of the Praetorian Guard

=== Ancient Greeks ===
- Secundus the Silent, second century philosopher who took a vow of silence

=== Early Christians ===
- Secundus of Abula, first century missionary and martyr
- Secundus of Asti (died 119), saint
- Secundus (died c. 295), martyr (see Carpophorus, Exanthus, Cassius, Severinus, Secundus, and Licinius)
- Secundus of Ptolemais, fourth century bishop
- Secundus of Non or Secundus of Trent (died c. 612), adviser to Lombard King Agilulf
- Secundus of Tigisis

=== Other ===
- Johannes Secundus (1511–1536), Dutch neo-Latin poet
- Petrus Lotichius Secundus (1528-1560), scholar and neo-Latin poet born Peter Lotz
- Alexander Monro (secundus) (1733–1817), Scottish physician

== Science fiction ==
- Secundus, a fictional planet in the Robert A. Heinlein novel Time Enough for Love and subsequent books featuring Lazarus Long
- Salusa Secundus, a formerly prison planet in Frank Herbert's Dune series. It was devastated by atomic weapons before the events of Dune: House Atreides in Brian Herbert's Legends of Dune
- Secundus Ando, a planet in the Star Wars The Clone Wars TV series. Also home of the Harch, a sentient arachnid species
- Imperium Secundus, known also as the Unremembered Empire in the Warhammer 40000 franchise, is the second stellar empire of Humanity created by the Ultramarines Primarch Roboute Guilliman during the Horus Heresy following the Battle of Calth and the Drop Site Massacre of Istvaan V.

== See also ==
- Primus (disambiguation)
- Tertius (disambiguation)
