= Prime (order theory) =

In mathematics, an element p of a partial order (P, ≤) is a meet prime element when p is the principal element of a principal prime ideal. Equivalently, if P is a lattice, p ≠ top, and for all a, b in P,

a∧b ≤ p implies a ≤ p or b ≤ p.

== See also ==
- Join and meet
