= Harpactocrates =

Scientific classification
- Kingdom: Animalia
- Phylum: Arthropoda
- Subphylum: Chelicerata
- Class: Arachnida
- Order: Araneae
- Infraorder: Araneomorphae
- Family: Dysderidae
- Genus: Harpactocrates; Simon, 1914

Type species
- H. drassoides (Simon, 1882)

Species
- 13, see text

Genus of spiders

Harpactocrates is a genus of woodlouse hunting spiders that was first described by Eugène Simon in 1914.

== Species ==
As of May 2019 it contains thirteen species:

- Harpactocrates apennicola Simon, 1914 – France, Italy
- Harpactocrates cazorlensis Ferrández, 1986 – Spain
- Harpactocrates drassoides (Simon, 1882) (type) – Western Europe
- Harpactocrates escuderoi Ferrández, 1986 – Spain
- Harpactocrates globifer Ferrández, 1986 – Spain
- Harpactocrates gredensis Ferrández, 1986 – Spain
- Harpactocrates gurdus Simon, 1914 – Spain, France
- Harpactocrates intermedius Dalmas, 1915 – France, Italy
- Harpactocrates meridionalis Ferrández & Martin, 1986 – Spain
- Harpactocrates radulifer Simon, 1914 – Spain, France
- Harpactocrates ravastellus Simon, 1914 – Spain, France
- Harpactocrates trialetiensis Mcheidze, 1997 – Georgia
- Harpactocrates troglophilus Brignoli, 1978 – Turkey
