= Nathaniel Prime (naval officer) =

Nathaniel Prime was an American naval officer in command of the 17th US Infantry contingent and received the personal side arms surrendered by Confederate States Navy Lieutenant Charles Read. Prime wrote about the attack and capture in the U.S. government's Official Records of the War of the Rebellion.
