= Priming (agriculture) =

Nano seed priming in botany and agriculture is a form of seed planting preparation in which the seeds are pre-soaked in nanoparticle solution. Seeds are considered to be an important part of crop life cycle as it influences the propagation of critical phases like germination and dormancy. Seed priming before sowing is considered to be one of the promising ways to provide value-added solutions to maximize the natural potential of seed to set the plant for maximum yield potential with respect to both quality and quantity. There is a positive effect on the shoot and root growth of seedlings of wheat (Triticum aestivum L.) when treated with iron-oxide nanoparticles. This innovative cost-effective and user-friendly method of biofortification has proven to increase grain iron deposition upon harvesting. Hence, the intervention of nanotechnology in terms of seed priming could be an economical and user-friendly smart farming approach to increase the nutritive value of the grains in an eco-friendly manner.

Priming is not an extremely widely used method. In general, most kinds of seeds experimented with so far have shown an overall advantage over seeds that are not primed. Many have shown a faster emergence time (the time it takes for seeds to rise above the surface of the soil), a higher emergence rate (the number of seeds that make it to the surface), and better growth, suggesting that the head-start helps them to establish an early root system and grow faster. This method can be useful to farmers because it saves them the money and time spent for fertilization and re-seeding.

== Mechanism of Priming ==
During priming, a seed is exposed to stimuli, which triggers a series of interconnected biochemical reactions. These reactions lead to the creation of chemicals that promote growth, the activation of enzymes, the metabolism of germination inhibitors, and the repair of cell damage.
