= Exploratory Science Center =

- Industry: Pharmaceutical
- Founded: 2016
- Headquarters: 320 Bent Street; Cambridge, Massachusetts
- Parent: Merck & Co.

The Exploratory Science Center (ESC) is a pharmaceutical company based in Cambridge, MA. The disease agnostic research site was founded in 2016, and was led by Daria Hazuda (Chief Scientific Officer) until 2021. In late 2021 Juan Alvarez took on leadership as the interim head and Marc Levesque took on leadership in 2022. The Exploratory Science Center is a subsidiary of Merck & Co.

The Exploratory Science Center consists of interdisciplinary scientific groups, including biologists, chemists, and data scientists. The site is co-located with a business development and licensing group as well as the venture capital group Merck Ventures Fund. The research focuses primarily on the microbiome and human immunity, although the research focus is intended to be fluid and flexible. The site is kept intentionally small, so as to facilitate close collaborations and a startup-like atmosphere.

== History ==
The Exploratory Science Center site was originally occupied by a Schering-Plough innovation research site, which opened in 2006 and focused on small molecule drugs. The innovation research site became part of Merck & Co. when it merged with Schering-Plough in 2009. Shortly after the merger, in 2010 Merck & Co. announced the closure of their Cambridge research site, after which it was occupied by Idenix Pharmaceuticals.

Merck & Co. purchased the pharmaceutical company Idenix Pharmaceuticals in 2014 for $3.85 billion. The acquisition included its previously occupied research space in Kendall Square, a neighborhood within the Biotechnology industry in Boston. The 50,000 square foot space was converted to the current Exploratory Science Center space and began new operations in 2016 under the leadership of Daria Hazuda. This transition back to research in Cambridge came as part of Merck's east coast reorganization, in which employees were transitioned out of New Jersey and Pennsylvania sites, and repositioned in Cambridge, as well as some in the San Francisco Bay Area. The Exploratory Science Center sits as a major component to the parent company Merck & Co. strategy of regional innovation hubs located in Cambridge, Massachusetts, San Francisco, and London.

In 2022, Merck announced it would be expanding the Exploratory Science Center by hiring an additional 100 employees and adding 160,000 additional square feet to the Bent Street facility. The site has capacity for 250 total scientists, and the expansion was paired with an extended remit for the site to include additional capability development as well as target identification and validation.

== Research ==
=== Mapping cell surface microenvironments ===
ESC scientists collaborated with researchers at Princeton University to develop visible-light-based techniques to map protein interactions on cell surfaces. In a collaboration between the ESC and Efficiency Aggregators (an energy efficiency company), an energy efficient biophotoreactor was developed to facilitate these light-powered biological studies. This line of research was aimed at identifying drug targets using visible-light-based photocatalytic methods to interrogate cell surface protein microenvironments. Applications included mapping proteins around PDL1, which is relevant to cancer immunotherapy. This is expected to continue as a line of research for the university laboratory, with applications to more cell surface proteins. The platform technology was spun out into InduPro, a biotech company founded in 2022 by three Merck scientists, including Rob Oslund and Niyi Fadeyi, who co-invented the mapping technology.

=== Deep learning & natural products ===
The ESC research site has demonstrated an interest in natural product drug discovery using machine learning and genome mining approaches. This work included the development of an open source tool named DeepBGC, which provided a machine learning approach to biosynthetic gene cluster identification. Researchers have tied this approach to the microbiome, as a way of understanding microbiome mechanisms and their interactions with the human immune system

=== 3D cancer tumor model technology ===
Researchers at the ESC published the development of a 3D tumor spheroid models which allow for the study of Anaerobic bacteria in the tumor microenvironment. This technology has been used to understand the association of Fusobacterium nucleatum with Colorectal cancer.

== Outreach & education ==
Scientists at the ESC partnered with the Bunker Hill Community College in 2018 to pair students with mentor researchers. This was a semester-long program aimed at providing students with scientific exposure and development opportunities.

In 2019, the Exploratory Science Center hosted a microbiome conference titled the "Systems Biology of the Microbiome Symposium".
