= Primus (Marvel Comics) =

Primus is the name of three characters appearing in American comic books published by Marvel Comics.

== Publication history ==
Arnim Zola's Primus first appeared in Captain America #209 and was created by Jack Kirby.

The alien Primus first appeared in Marvel Spotlight vol. 2 #4 and was created by Archie Goodwin and Steve Ditko.

The Flb'Dbi version of Primus first appeared in Fantastic Four #221 and was created by John Byrne.

== Fictional character biography ==
=== Arnim Zola's Primus ===
Primus

Publication information
- Publisher: Marvel Comics
- First appearance: Captain America #209 (May 1977)
- Created by: Jack Kirby

In-story information
- Species: Android
- Team affiliations: Thunderbolts
- Notable aliases: Steve Rogers
- Abilities: Shapeshifting

The first Primus is a shapeshifting artificial humanoid created by Arnim Zola. Primus thinks independently, and has superhuman strength and can harden his body to stone-like consistency. He can also alter his shape, so as to resemble a human. Arnim Zola caused Primus to merge with Doughboy, which was another of his creations, and which could assume unusual shapes. Primus can now turn himself into Doughboy and retain mental control of Doughboy while in the latter's form.

Primus has been a foe of Captain America, and the New Warriors, and an ally of the Mad Thinker.

=== Alien Primus ===
Primus

Publication information
- Publisher: Marvel Comics
- First appearance: Marvel Spotlight vol. 2, #4 (January 1980)
- Created by: Archie Goodwin; Steve Ditko

In-story information
- Alter ego: Primus
- Abilities: Transformation into living shadow

Being born to alien parents of the planet Archko, Primus spent most of his childhood living there. At one point, he was attacked by the Screamers, who killed his parents and his wife Stara. Primus was revealed to have trained in the use of shadow powers originating from the Shadow Realm. He fled to Earth where he was found by the first Captain Marvel (Mar-Vell). Together they defeat the Screamers, and Mar-Vell offers to help Primus get his life back in order, but Primus chooses to live alone.

=== Flb'Dbi's Primus ===
Primus

Publication information
- Publisher: Marvel Comics
- First appearance: Fantastic Four #221 (August 1980)
- Created by: John Byrne

In-story information
- Species: Flb'Dbi
- Abilities: Telepathy

Over 500,000 years prior, Primus led an exploratory colonization for the Flb'Dbi species. After some time on Earth, a phenomenon occurred which reversed the Earth's magnetic poles, rendering the Flb'Dbi's technonology inoperative and leaving the Flb'Dbi unable to leave Earth until the polarity could be restored. While the Flb'Dbi drones worked to find a way to restore the polarity, Primus and the rest of the Flb'Dbi placed themselves in hibernation. In the present day, the drones succeed in fixing the polarity. Primus and the Flb'Dbi awaken from their hibernation, unaware of what has happened on Earth during their slumber. The Flb'Dbi then programmed their drones to construct a tower to accomplish the polarity reversal which started to have untold effects on the Earth. The Fantastic Four encounter the Flb'Dbi and fix their technology, enabling them to leave Earth. Primus and the Flb'Dbi board their ship and left Earth while Thing shatters the Polarity Towers so that nobody can use them for their own purposes.
