= Priam (disambiguation) =

Priam, Priamus, or Priamos is a non-Greek name of a legendary king of Troy, probably of Luwian origin. It may refer to:

== People and fictional characters ==
- Priam, son of Laomedon, king of Troy
- Priam, son of Polites, a Trojan mentioned in the Aeneid

== Places ==
- Priam, Minnesota, an unincorporated community
- Mount Priam, a mountain of the Trojan Range in Antarctica
- Priam, a misname of Trenton, Indiana

== Companies ==
- Priam Corporation, a hard disk manufacturer between 1978 and 1989
- Priam Systems Corporation, a hard disk manufacturing company between 1990 and 1991

== Other uses ==
- Priam (horse, foaled 1827), a British Thoroughbred racehorse
- Priam (horse, foaled 1970), an Indonesian racehorse
- Priamus (journal), a journal
- PRIAM enzyme-specific profiles, a method for the automatic detection of likely enzymes in protein sequences

== See also ==
- Priyam (disambiguation)
