= C. P. J. Mooney =

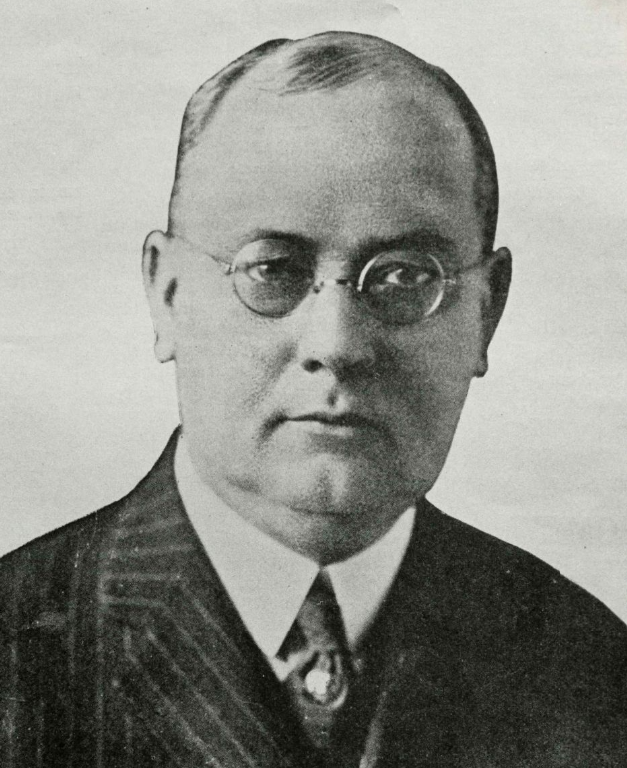
C. P. J. Mooney in 1924

Charles Patrick Joseph Mooney (1865 – November 22, 1926) was an American newspaper publisher, becoming"one of the widest known newspapermen of the south".

Born at Bardstown Junction, Kentucky Mooney was "tireless, combative and a devoutly Catholic teetotaler". He was the managing editor of The Commercial Appeal in Memphis, Tennessee, from 1896 to 1902, and again from 1908 until his death in 1926. Mooney was also known for his temper, with one report stating:

Mooney once nearly killed a reporter who had shown up drunk in the newsroom. The two men brawled so violently in the office that other staff members had to separate them. Later, after the reporter approached Mooney on a Downtown street, apparently to apologize, the editor pulled a gun and fired a shot that missed only because another man shoved his arm just in time.
