= Prime (graffiti artist) =

American graffiti artist

- Born: Jose Reza; October 5, 1971 (age 54); Los Angeles, California, U.S.

Jose "Prime" Reza, (born October 5, 1971) is an American graffiti artist born and raised in the Pico-Union District of Downtown Los Angeles. Prime is credited with being a founding father of Los Angeles stylized graffiti lettering, a hybrid of Cholo lettering and East Coast style graffiti that is often bold, aggressive, and monochromatic.

Prime is considered one of the most influential artists in the history of Los Angeles public wall writing, combining "traditional east coast painting techniques with geometric gangster-style blocks."

Complex Magazine included Prime on their list "25 greatest L.A. Graffiti Writers" noting that, "...his pieces from the early 80's still shit on most stuff today." The Vibe History of Hip Hop acknowledges Prime's vital contributions to L.A.'s distinctive graffiti style in a chapter titled "Early Los Angeles Hip Hop" written by Ben Higa.

== Early life and education ==
His parents immigrated to Los Angeles, California from Tamaulipas, Mexico and settled in Pico-Union, a historic neighborhood once known for its high density, Latino population, gang violence, and illegal drug commerce.

== Work ==
Prime gained international exposure in 1987 when his work was featured in the seminal book Spraycan Art, one of the earliest documentations of graffiti culture and inspired additional movements around the world. In the book, Graffiti L.A.: Street Styles and Art Steve Grody writes of Prime, "His battle piece representing K2S crew against WCA crew in 1985 is arguably the single most influential piece in the establishment of L.A. style."

=== Collaborative works ===
Prime is one of the original members of the Kill 2 Succeed (K2S) graffiti crew, established in 1985 by Rick One along with Geo, Alex "Defer" Kizu, and Risco, which created murals throughout Los Angeles.

=== Recent Projects ===
In 2013 Prime designed the cover of The Getty Research Institute's L.A. Liber Amicorum (The Getty Graffiti Black Book), a modern-day rare manuscript bound together into a single work of art that includes 143 graffiti and tattoo artists from Los Angeles.

The creation of The Getty Graffiti Black Book/L.A. Liber Amicorum led to "Scratch," an exhibition at the El Segundo Museum of Art which opened in June, 2014. "Scratch" created a live book of friendship in gallery environment, with the gallery walls curated by six different artists and painted with their friends. Prime participated in a wall curated by Alex "Defer" Kizu, titled Dark Progressivism.

== Personal life ==
In 1989, Prime survived a gang-related shooting. The artist was shot at point blank range by two different assailants with two separate firearms, losing full movement of his right hand for many years. Prime responded by training himself to write and paint with his left hand, which is how he primarily paints today, although he has developed ambidextrous skills and at times switches hands.

== Exhibitions ==
- ”CottonWood”series Solo exhibit, OGalleryLA, WestHollywood, CA, 2020
- Roll Call: 11 artists from L.A., L.A. Louver Gallery, Venice, CA, 2016
- Dark Progressivism: Metropolis Rising, special exhibition, LA Art Show, Los Angeles, CA, 2015
- Scratch, El Segundo Museum of Art, El Segundo, CA. 2014
- Alphabet Soup, Boathouse Gallery, Los Angeles, CA, 2013
- Trece, Boathouse Gallery, Plaza de la Raza, Los Angeles, CA. 2012
- Records Revisionists Show, Warner Brothers Studios, Los Angeles, CA. 2012
- Street Cred: Graffiti Art from Concrete to Canvas, Pasadena Museum of California Art, Pasadena, CA. 2011
- Art in the Streets, Museum of Contemporary Art, Los Angeles, 2011
- Through The Wormhole", MING Studios, Boise, ID. 2018
