= John Prime =

John Prime (1549/50 - 11/12 April 1596) was an English Church of England clergyman and Protestant preacher during the reign of Queen Elizabeth I.

He was born in Holywell, Oxford, the son of Anthony Wood. From 1564 he was scholar of Winchester College and from 1569 scholar of New College, Oxford (he was appointed fellow in 1571). In 1572 he was awarded a BA in 1572 and in 1576 an MA. In 1575 he was ordained, in 1581 he was awarded a preaching licence and was awarded the degrees of BTh (1584) and DTh (1588).

In 1583 appeared his A Short Treatise of the Sacraments, which he dedicated to Sir Francis Walsingham. He attacked the Catholic Rheims translation of the New Testament in his Fruitefull and Briefe Discourse...of Nature...[and] of Grace and acquired a reputation as a fiercely pro-Protestant preacher. He was also against Martin Marprelate.

== Works ==
- A Short Treatise of the Sacraments (1583).
- Fruitefull and Briefe Discourse...of Nature...[and] of Grace (1583).
- Sermon Briefly Comparing the Estate of King Salomon and his Subjects with Queene Elizabeth and her People (1585).
- An Exposition and Observations upon St Paul to the Galatians (1587).
- The Consolations of David Briefly Applied to Queen Elizabeth (1588).
