= Primal Fear =

Primal Fear may refer to:

- Primal Fear (band), a German power metal band
  - Primal Fear (album), their debut album
- Primal Fear (novel), a 1993 thriller novel by William Diehl
- Primal Fear (film), a 1996 film based on Diehl's novel
- "Primal Fear" (NCIS: Hawaiʻi), an episode of the American TV series NCIS: Hawaiʻi
