= PRIME (labeling technique) =

PRIME (probe incorporation mediated by enzymes) is a molecular biology research tool developed by Alice Y. Ting and the Ting Lab at MIT for site-specific labeling of proteins in living cells with chemical probes. Probes often have useful biophysical properties, such as fluorescence, and allow imaging of proteins. Ultimately, PRIME enables scientists to study functions of specific proteins of interest.

== Significance ==
Protein labeling with fluorescent molecules allows the visualization of protein dynamics, localization, and protein-protein interactions, and therefore serves as an important technique to understand protein functions and networks in living cells. The protein labeling should have a high selectivity towards the protein of interest, and should not interfere with the natural functions of the protein. Although genetic coding of fluorescent proteins, such as the green fluorescent protein (GFP), is the most popular technique due to its high specificity, fluorescent proteins are likely to interfere with the functions of the protein to which they are fused because of their large sizes. There are multiple tagging tools, such as HaloTag, SNAP tag, and FlAsH, developed in order to overcome the weakness of traditional protein labeling with fluorescent proteins. However, they still have significant shortcomings either due to the large size of a tag or the low specificity of the labeling process. PRIME has been developed in order to achieve a high labeling specificity comparable to fluorescent proteins with small molecules.

== Principles ==
In PRIME, a mutant enzyme LplA (lipoic acid ligase from Escherichia coli) first catalyzes the conjugation of the "functional group handle" and LplA acceptor peptide (LAP), which is genetically fused to the protein of interest. “Functional group handle” indicates a bridge molecule connecting a LAP tag to a fluorescent probe or fluorophore. Fluorescent probe reacts with the “functional group handle” connected to the tag, and ultimately labels the protein of interest. Different chemical reactions can be utilized to attach the fluorescent probe to a complex consisting of the protein, the LAP tag, and the bridge: Diels-Alder Reaction, and chelation-assisted copper-catalyzed azide-alkyne cycloaddition (CuAAC) (refer to Azide-alkyne Huisgen cycloaddition). Two other versions of PRIME labeling technologies use mutant LplA proteins to directly incorporate a fluorophore to the LAP-tagged protein of interest.

== Limitations ==
Despite the advantages of PRIME over other tagging methods, PRIME still has some possible limitations. First of all, the LAP tag may interfere with the function of proteins to which it is fused. It is recommended that the experimenters perform control experiments in order to make sure that the tagged recombinant protein functions properly. Secondly, even at a low concentration, chemicals such as the fluorescent probe can be toxic to the cells. Experimenters are also required to obtain the right balance between maximal signal of fluorescence and minimal disruption of cellular function.
