= Primer =

Primer may refer to:

== Arts, entertainment, and media ==
=== Films ===
- Primer (film), a 2004 feature film written and directed by Shane Carruth
- Primer (video), a documentary about the funk band Living Colour

=== Literature ===
- Primer (textbook), a textbook used in primary education to teach the alphabet and other basic subjects
- Primer (prayer book), a common name for English prayer books used from the 13th to 16th centuries
- The New England Primer (1688), a Puritan book from Colonial America with morality-themed rhymes

=== Music ===
- Primer (album), a 1995 music album by the musical group Rockapella
- Primer 55, an American alternative metal band

== Firearms ==
- Primer (firearms), a firearm powder charge-ignition mechanism
  - Centerfire ammunition, Boxer or Berdan primers used in modern centerfire cartridges
  - Detonator, a small explosive device also known as an explosive primer or blasting cap
  - Friction primer, an ignition device for muzzle-loading cannon
  - Percussion cap, a gunpowder ignition device for 19th century muzzle-loading firearms and modern replicas

== Coatings ==
- Primer (cosmetics), a cream or lotion applied before another to improve coverage and persistence
- Primer (paint), a coating applied to a surface to prepare it for paint or another coating or adhesive

== Fonts ==
- Great primer, a font size of 18 points
- Long primer, a font size between bourgeois and small pica
- Primer (typeface)

== People ==
- Sylvester Primer (1842–1912), American linguist and philologist
- John Primer (born 1945), American Chicago singer and guitarist

== Software ==
- Primer (app), free mobile application by Google
- Primer-E Primer, software for statistical analysis of ecological data

== Other uses ==
- Primer (gasoline engine), a device on some petrol engines used to prime the engine with gasoline before starting it
- Primer (molecular biology), a nucleic acid strand (or related molecule) that serves as a starting point for replication
- Money-creation primer
- Trap primer, a plumbing device or valve that adds water to traps

== See also ==
- Premier (disambiguation)
- Priming (disambiguation)
