= Cape Town Treaty =

2001 treaty

Cape Town Convention on International Interests in Mobile Equipment
- Parties Signatories Parties, also covered by EU's accession Signatories, also covered by EU's accession covered by EU's accession
- Signed: 16 November 2001
- Location: Cape Town, South Africa
- Effective: 1 March 2006
- Condition: 3 ratifications
- Parties: 84
- Depositary: International Institute for the Unification of Private Law
- Citations: 2307 U.N.T.S. 285
- Languages: English, Arabic, Chinese, French, Russian and Spanish

Full text
- Convention on International Interests in Mobile Equipment at Wikisource

The Cape Town Convention on International Interests in Mobile Equipment, or Cape Town Treaty, is an international treaty intended to standardize transactions involving movable property. The treaty creates international standards for registration of contracts of sale (including dedicated registration agencies), security interests (liens), leases and conditional sales contracts, and various legal remedies for default in financing agreements, including repossession and the effect of particular states' bankruptcy laws.

Four protocols to the convention are specific to four types of movable equipment: Aircraft Equipment (aircraft and aircraft engines; signed in 2001), railway rolling stock (signed in 2007), space assets (signed in 2012) and "Mining, Agricultural and Construction Equipment" (signed in 2019). The aircraft Protocol entered into force in 2006, and the railway rolling stock Protocol entered into force in 2024. The others are not yet in effect.

The treaty resulted from a diplomatic conference held in Cape Town, South Africa in 2001. The conference was attended by 68 countries and 14 international organizations. 53 countries signed the resolution proposing the treaty. The treaty came into force on 1 March 2006, and has been ratified by 57 parties. The Aircraft Protocol (which applies specifically to aircraft and aircraft engines) took effect on 1 March 2006 when it was ratified by 9 countries: Ethiopia, Ireland, Malaysia, Nigeria, Oman, Panama, Pakistan, and the United States.

== Signatures and ratifications ==
As of 2024, the convention has been ratified by 87 states as well as the European Union. Most of those parties are also party to the Aircraft protocol. The railway rolling stock Protocol has been ratified by four countries (Gabon, Luxembourg, Spain and Sweden), as well as the European Union and came into effect in March 2024. The space assets Protocol has been acceded to by 1 country and remains not in force. An overview of the status of the treaty and protocols is shown below:

Instrument	Signature	Location	Entry into force	Signatures	Ratifications (required for entry into force)
Convention	16 November 2001	Cape Town	1 March 2006	28	88 (3)
Aircraft Protocol	16 November 2001	Cape Town	1 March 2006	23	86 (8)
Railway Rolling Stock Protocol	23 February 2007	Luxembourg	8 March 2024	12	7 (4)
Space Assets Protocol	9 March 2012	Berlin	-	4	1 (10)
Mining, Agricultural and Construction Equipment (MAC)	22 November 2019	Pretoria	1	6	1 (5)

=== European Union ===
The European Union joined the convention and the Aircraft Protocol as a Regional Economic Integration Organization. On the subject of the convention, both the Member states of the European Union and the Union itself have competence: e.g. while the substantive law regarding insolvency is regulated by the states, the conflict of law-rules (which county has jurisdiction etc.) is regulated by the European Union. According to the Government of the Netherlands the acceptance of the European Union in a member state which itself is not a party to the convention has no practical consequences. The European Union ratified the Luxembourg Rail protocol in December 2014 as a Regional Economic Integration Organization on the same basis.

== Protocols ==
Aircraft Protocol Parties Signed Parties, also covered by EU's accession Signatories, also covered by EU's accession Covered by EU's accession

=== Aircraft Protocol ===
The aircraft Protocol (officially: Protocol to the Convention on International Interests in Mobile Equipment on matters specific to aircraft equipment) was signed immediately with the treaty and the only protocol currently entered into force. It applies to aircraft which can carry at least eight people or 2750 kilograms of cargo, aircraft engines with thrust exceeding 1,750 pounds-force (7,800 N) or 550 horsepower (410 kW), and helicopters carrying five or more passengers. The International Registry of Mobile Assets established to record international property interests in the aircraft equipment covered by the treaty is located in Ireland. Mediation cases for leasing disputes are to be heard in the High Court of Ireland. As of 2022, the protocol has 85 contracting parties, which includes 84 states and the European Union.

State	Date of Ratification/ Accession	Comments
Afghanistan	25 July 2006	
Albania	30 October 2007	
Angola	30 April 2006	
Argentina	10 January 2018	
Australia	26 May 2015	
Bahrain	27 November 2012	
Bangladesh	15 December 2008	
Belarus	27 September 2011	
Benin	20 March 2025	
Bhutan	4 July 2014	
Brazil	30 November 2011	
Burkina Faso	8 September 2017	
Cameroon	14 April 2011	
Canada	21 December 2012	New Brunswick: effective 1 July 2016; Yukon: effective 1 October 2014 others: 1 April 2013
Cape Verde	26 September 2007	
China	3 February 2009	Excluding; Hong Kong; Macao
Colombia	19 February 2007	
Congo	13 March 2013	
Democratic Republic of Congo	6 May 2016	
Costa Rica	8 August 2018	
Côte d'Ivoire	1 March 2016	
Cuba	28 January 2009	
Cyprus	20 July 2023	
Denmark	26 October 2015	
Egypt	10 December 2014	
Ethiopia	21 November 2003	
European Union	28 April 2009	Only as far as it has competency over subjects of the convention/ protocol. Not applicable to Denmark
Fiji	30 May 2012	
Gabon	4 April 2017	
Ghana	20 December 2018	
Iceland	23 June 2020	
India	31 March 2008	
Indonesia	16 March 2007	
Ireland	23 August 2005	
Jordan	31 August 2010	
Kazakhstan	1 June 2011	
Kenya	13 October 2006	
Kuwait	31 October 2013	
Kyrgyzstan	13 May 2021	
Latvia	8 February 2011	
Luxembourg	27 June 2008	
Madagascar	15 December 2008	
Malawi	10 April 2013	
Malaysia	16 January 2014	
Malta	1 October 2010	
Mexico	31 July 2007	
Moldova	19 February 2019	
Mongolia	19 October 2006	
Mozambique	18 July 2013	
Myanmar	3 December 2012	
Namibia	23 July 2018	
Kingdom of the Netherlands	17 May 2010	Not European Netherlands; Only for Aruba; Curaçao; Sint Maarten; Caribbean Netherlands
New Zealand	20 July 2010	
Niger	17 November 2022	
Nigeria	16 December 2003	
Norway	20 December 2010	
Oman	21 March 2005	
Pakistan	22 January 2004	
Panama	28 July 2003	
Paraguay	19 December 2018	
Qatar	8 January 2020	
Romania	30 March 2018	
Russia	25 May 2011	
Rwanda	28 January 2010	
San Marino	9 September 2014	
Saudi Arabia	27 June 2008	
Senegal	9 January 2006	
Sierra Leone	26 July 2016	
Singapore	28 January 2009	
South Africa	18 January 2007	
Spain	27 November 2015	
Swaziland	17 November 2016	
Sweden	30 December 2015	
Tajikistan	31 May 2011	
Tanzania	30 January 2009	
Togo	1 December 2011	
Turkey	23 August 2011	
Uganda	11 October 2024	
Ukraine	31 July 2012	
United Arab Emirates	29 April 2008	
United Kingdom	27 July 2015	Extended to Cayman Islands, Gibraltar and Guernsey (2015), and the Isle of Man and Bermuda (2017)
United States	28 October 2004	
Uzbekistan	31 January 2018	
Vietnam	17 September 2014	
Zambia	7 September 2020	

=== Railway Rolling Stock ===
The Railway Rolling Stock Protocol, or Luxembourg Rail Protocol, officially the Protocol to the Convention on International Interests in Mobile Equipment on Matters Specific to Railway Rolling Stock was adopted on 23 February 2007 at a diplomatic conference in Luxembourg and applies to railway rolling stock (broadly defined as "vehicles movable on a fixed railway track or directly on, above or below a guideway"). It came into force on 8 March 2024.

The protocol establishes an international registry located in Luxembourg at which all international interests under the protocol will be registrable. The registry will also issue unique identifiers for rolling stock on request. Regulis S.A., a subsidiary of SITA, was appointed in November 2014 to act as Registrar. The Protocol also establishes URVIS (Unique Rail Vehicle Identification System), which came into force on 8 March 2024

The protocol required ratification by 4 countries, together with a certification by the secretariat to the Supervisory Authority that the registry is fully operational, in order to enter into force. Currently, it has been signed by France, Gabon, Germany, Italy, Luxembourg, Mozambique, South Africa, Spain, Switzerland, Sweden, the UK as well as the European Union, while it has been ratified by the European Union and 6 states: Gabon, Luxembourg, Paraguay, South Africa, Spain and Sweden.

=== Space Assets ===
The Space Assets protocol, or Berlin Space Protocol (officially Protocol to the Convention on International Interests in Mobile Equipment on Matters specific to Space Assets) was concluded on 9 March 2012 and requires 10 ratifications before entry into force. The protocol applies to objects functioning in space like satellites or satellite parts. The convention was strongly opposed by the satellite industry, claiming that it would lead to increased bureaucracy and "make the financing of new satellite projects more difficult and expensive". The convention has been signed by 5 countries (Burkina Faso, Germany, Saudi Arabia, United States and Zimbabwe), but no country has ratified it.

=== Mining, Agricultural, and Construction (MAC) Equipment ===
On 22 November 2019, a fourth protocol to the convention was adopted to extend the convention's framework to mining, agricultural, and construction (MAC) equipment, named Protocol to the Convention on International Interests in Mobile Equipment on Matters specific to mining, agricultural, and construction equipment. The protocol was signed by 4 states (Congo, Gambia, Nigeria and Paraguay) upon its adoption and requires 5 ratifications before entry into force (provided the registry is operational then). On 1 October 2020, the United States of America signed the MAC Protocol and in 2022 the European Union bringing the total number of signatories to 6
