= Primal (2016 film) =

Well
- Directed by: Attila Gigor
- Written by: Attila Gigor
- Produced by: Ferenc Pusztai
- Cinematography: Máté Herbai
- Edited by: Wanda Kiss
- Production company: KMH Film
- Distributed by: Vertigo Media
- Release date: 22 September 2016
- Running time: 95 minutes
- Country: Hungary
- Language: Hungarian

Well or Primal (Hungarian: Kút) is a 2016 Hungarian drama film directed by Attila Gigor. Taking place over three days at a remote filling station, it revolves around a man who meets his father for the first time in 30 years, as well as a group of prostitutes whose van breaks down on the way to Switzerland.

== Plot ==
At an isolated filling station on a quiet road leading to the border, run by a drunken old man named István and Zoli his handicapped friend, Istvan's long-lost son turns up, a sullen young man named Laci. Fresh out of prison and unable to find work, he hopes his father will help him get back on his feet. While Zoli is glad to have some company, István is unenthusiastic, not wanting any strangers about the place.

Next day, some acquaintances of his arrive - four prostitutes, and two handlers who are taking them to work in Switzerland. Their van refuses to start and they all have to spend the night there. Laci has a fling with one of the girls, Marcsi, who has doubts about her career choice. In the morning, István has a furious argument with one of the handlers, to whom he was meant to be supplying some illegal merchandise, and is killed. In fury, Laci kills the murderer and begs Marcsi to join him as he flees, but she has doubts. When the owner of the girls turns up with four more handlers, Laci reappears in another effort to reclaim Marcsi and another battle results in more bodies .....

== Cast ==
- Péter Jankovics as Laci
- Zsolt Kovács as István
- Nóra Trokán as Hajni
- Niké Kurta as Marcsi
- Roland Tzafetás as Zoli
- Lia Pokorny as Vera
- Pusztai Ferenc as Mihály

== Production ==
The film was produced by KMH Film with support from the Hungarian Film Fund. Filming took 34 days.

== Release ==
The film was released theatrically in Hungary on 22 September 2016 through Vertigo Media.
