= Lex rei sitae =

Lex rei sitae is a legal doctrine of property law and of International private law. It is Latin for "the law where the property is situated". The law governing the transfer of title to property is dependent upon, and varies with, the lex rei sitae.

LEX REI SITAE: "...real estate or immovable property is exclusively subject to the laws of the government within whose territory it is situated.".
