= List of Dysderidae species =

This page lists all described genera and species of the spider family Dysderidae. As of April 2019, the World Spider Catalog accepts 625 species in 24 genera:

== C ==
=== Cryptoparachtes ===
Cryptoparachtes Dunin, 1992

- Cryptoparachtes adzharicus Dunin, 1992 (type) — Georgia
- Cryptoparachtes charitonowi (Mcheidze, 1972) — Georgia
- Cryptoparachtes fedotovi (Charitonov, 1956) — Georgia, Azerbaijan

== D ==
=== Dasumia ===
Dasumia Thorell, 1875

- Dasumia amoena (Kulczyński, 1897) — Eastern Europe, Russia (Caucasus)
- Dasumia canestrinii (L. Koch, 1876) — Southern Europe
- Dasumia carpatica (Kulczyński, 1882) — Central Europe
- Dasumia cephalleniae Brignoli, 1976 — Greece
- Dasumia chyzeri (Kulczyński, 1906) — Eastern Europe
- Dasumia crassipalpis (Simon, 1882) — Syria, Israel
- Dasumia diomedea Caporiacco, 1947 — Italy
- Dasumia gasparoi Kunt, Özkütük & Elverici, 2011 — Turkey
- Dasumia kusceri (Kratochvíl, 1935) — Macedonia, Bulgaria, Kosovo?
- Dasumia laevigata (Thorell, 1873) (type) — Europe
- Dasumia mariandyna Brignoli, 1979 — Turkey
- Dasumia nativitatis Brignoli, 1974 — Greece
- Dasumia sancticedri Brignoli, 1978 — Lebanon
- Dasumia taeniifera Thorell, 1875 — France, Switzerland, Italy

=== Dysdera ===
Dysdera

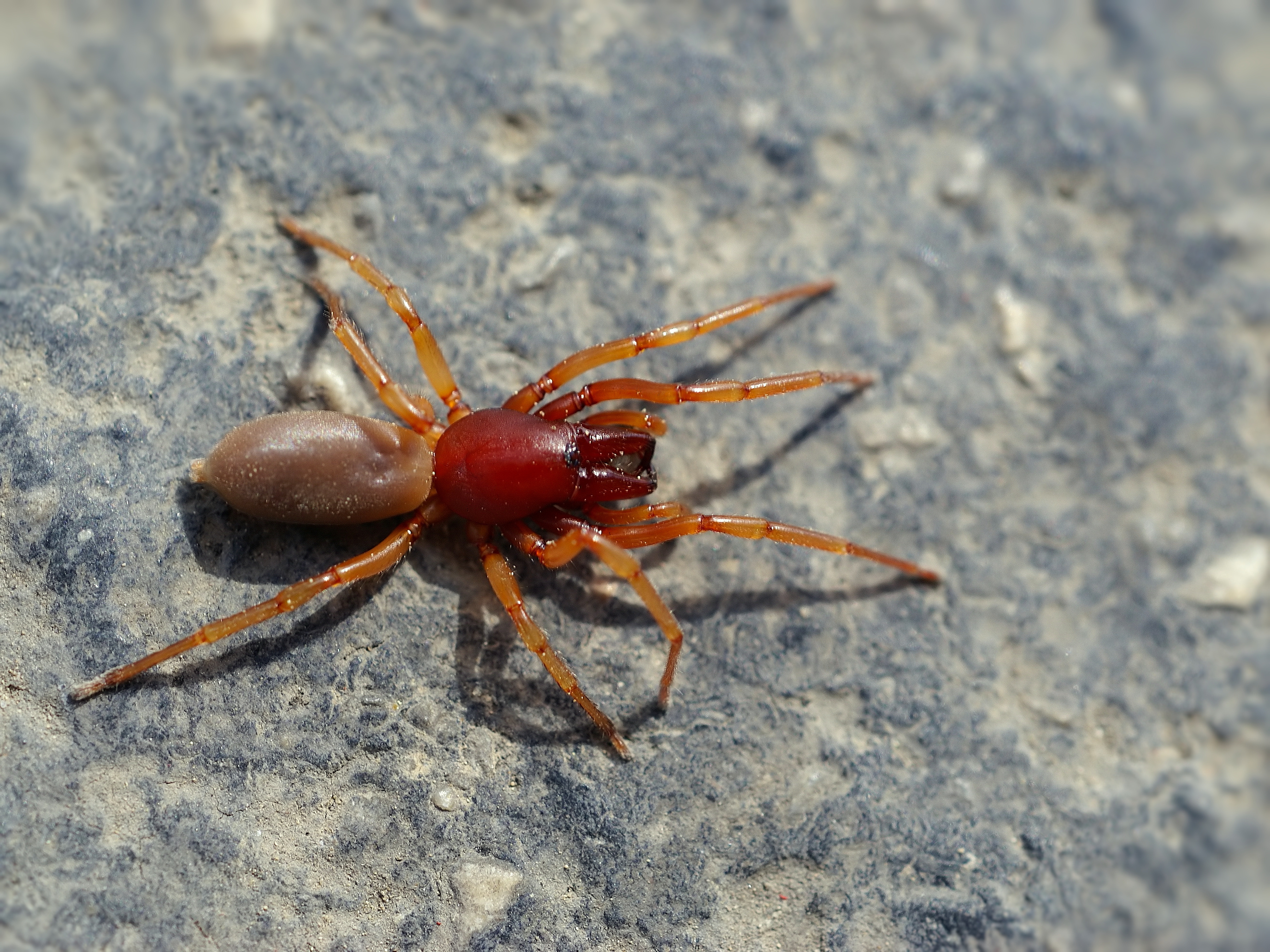
Woodlouse spider
(Dysdera crocata), male

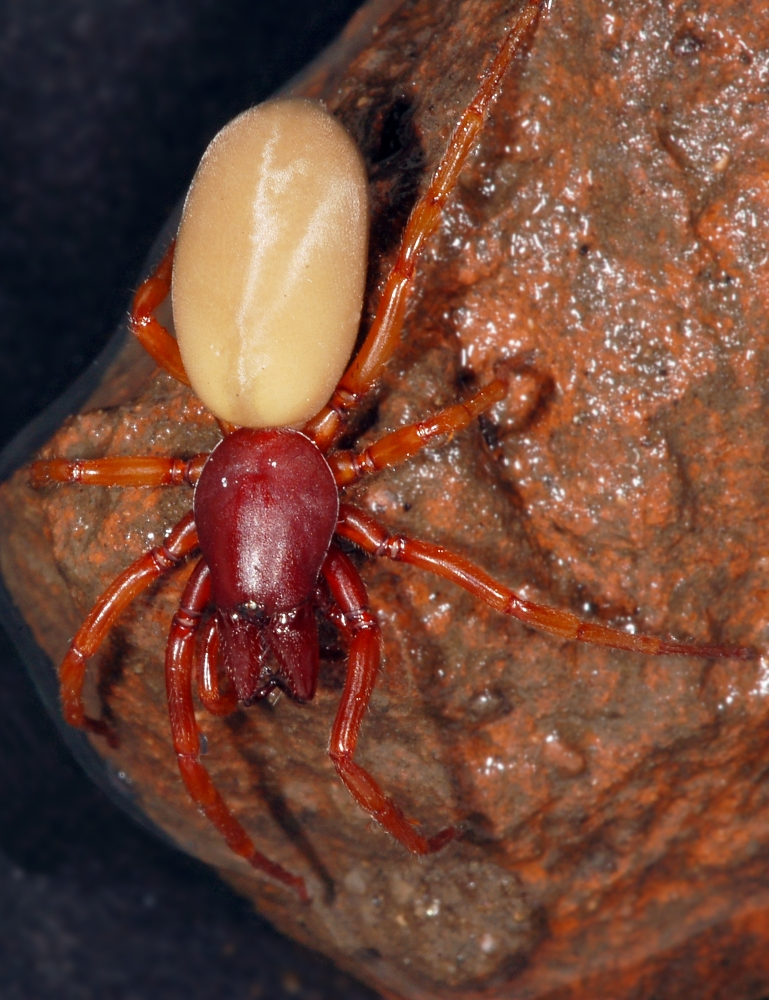
False woodlouse spider
(Dysdera erythrina)

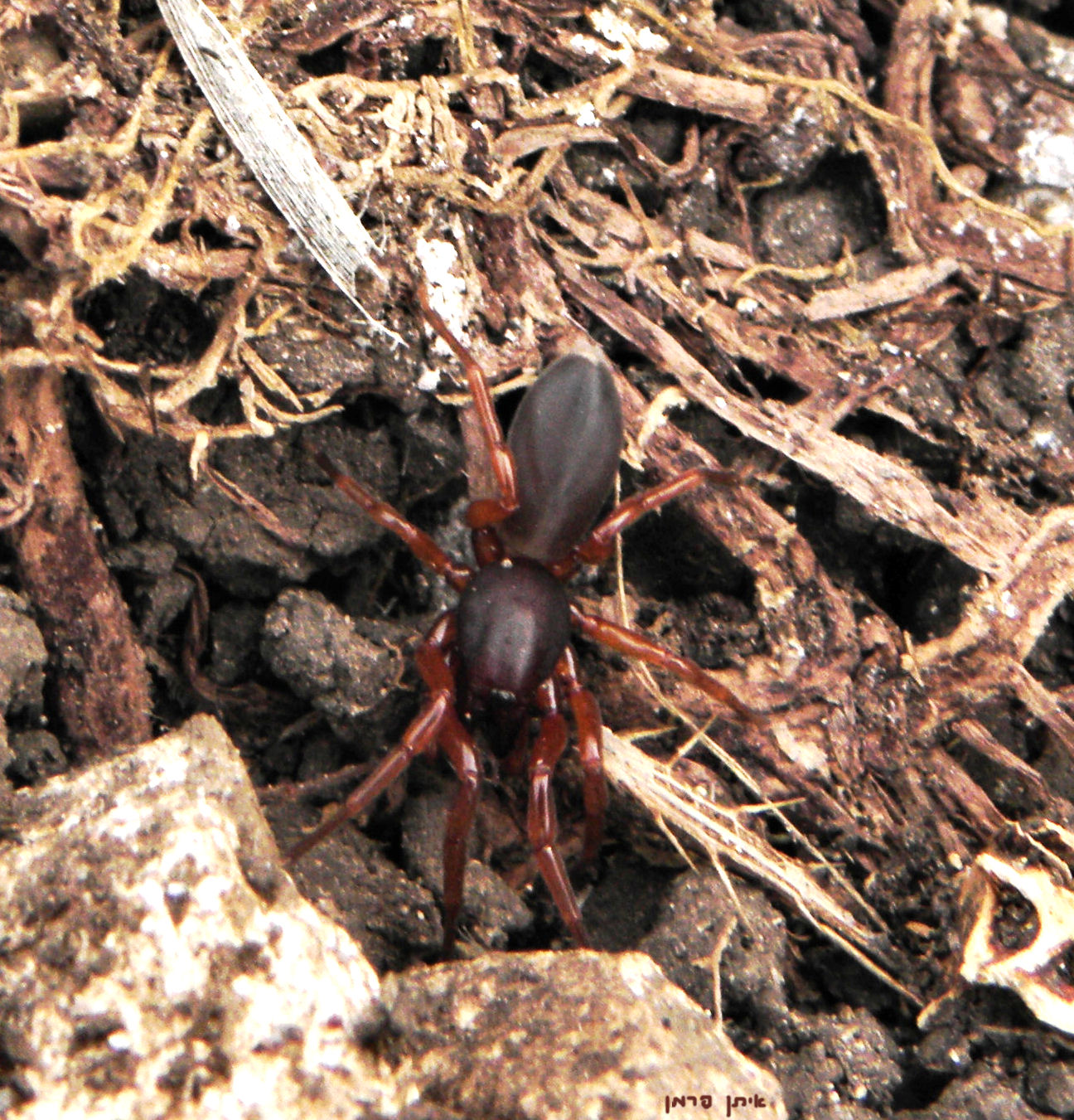
Dysdera spinicrus

Dysdera Latreille, 1804

- Dysdera aberrans Gasparo, 2010 — Italy
- Dysdera aciculata Simon, 1882 — Algeria
- Dysdera aculeata Kroneberg, 1875 — Central Asia, Iran? Introduced to Croatia
- Dysdera adriatica Kulczyński, 1897 — Austria, Balkans
- Dysdera affinis Ferrández, 1996 — Spain
- Dysdera afghana Denis, 1958 — Afghanistan
- Dysdera akpinarae Varol, 2016 — Turkey
- Dysdera alegranzaensis Wunderlich, 1992 — Canary Is.
- Dysdera alentejana Ferrández, 1996 — Portugal
- Dysdera ambulotenta Ribera, Ferrández & Blasco, 1986 — Canary Is.
- Dysdera anatoliae Deeleman-Reinhold, 1988 — Turkey
- Dysdera ancora Grasshoff, 1959 — Italy
- Dysdera andamanae Arnedo & Ribera, 1997 — Canary Is.
- Dysdera andreini Caporiacco, 1928 — Italy, Albania
- Dysdera aneris Macías-Hernández & Arnedo, 2010 — Selvagens Is.
- Dysdera anonyma Ferrández, 1984 — Spain
- Dysdera apenninica Alicata, 1964 — Italy
- Dysdera apenninica aprutiana Alicata, 1964 — Italy
- Dysdera arabiafelix Gasparo & van Harten, 2006 — Yemen
- Dysdera arabica Deeleman-Reinhold, 1988 — Oman
- Dysdera arabisenen Arnedo & Ribera, 1997 — Canary Is.
- Dysdera argaeica Nosek, 1905 — Turkey
- Dysdera arganoi Gasparo, 2004 — Italy
- Dysdera armenica Charitonov, 1956 — Armenia, Georgia
- Dysdera arnedoi Lissner, 2017 — Spain (Majorca)
- Dysdera arnoldii Charitonov, 1956 — Central Asia
- Dysdera asiatica Nosek, 1905 — Turkey, Iran (?)
- Dysdera atlantea Denis, 1954 — Morocco
- Dysdera atlantica Simon, 1909 — Morocco
- Dysdera aurgitana Ferrández, 1996 — Spain
- Dysdera azerbajdzhanica Charitonov, 1956 — Caucasus (Russia, Georgia, Azerbaijan)
- Dysdera baetica Ferrández, 1984 — Spain
- Dysdera balearica Thorell, 1873 — Spain (Majorca)
- Dysdera bandamae Schmidt, 1973 — Canary Is.
- Dysdera baratellii Pesarini, 2001 — Italy
- Dysdera beieri Deeleman-Reinhold, 1988 — Greece
- Dysdera bellimundi Deeleman-Reinhold, 1988 — Montenegro, Albania
- Dysdera bernardi Denis, 1966 — Libya
- Dysdera bicolor Taczanowski, 1874 — French Guiana
- Dysdera bicornis Fage, 1931 — Spain
- Dysdera bidentata Dunin, 1990 — Azerbaijan
- Dysdera bogatschevi Dunin, 1990 — Georgia, Azerbaijan
- Dysdera borealicaucasica Dunin, 1991 — Russia (Caucasus)
- Dysdera bottazziae Caporiacco, 1951 — Italy, Croatia
- Dysdera breviseta Wunderlich, 1992 — Canary Is.
- Dysdera brevispina Wunderlich, 1992 — Canary Is.
- Dysdera brignoliana Gasparo, 2000 — Italy
- Dysdera brignolii Dunin, 1989 — Turkmenistan
- Dysdera caeca Ribera, 1993 — Morocco
- Dysdera calderensis Wunderlich, 1987 — Canary Is.
- Dysdera castillonensis Ferrández, 1996 — Spain
- Dysdera catalonica Řezáč, 2018 — Spain
- Dysdera cechica Řezáč, 2018 — Austria, Czechia, Slovakia, Hungary, Serbia?
- Dysdera centroitalica Gasparo, 1997 — Italy
- Dysdera cephalonica Deeleman-Reinhold, 1988 — Greece
- Dysdera charitonowi Mcheidze, 1979 — Georgia
- Dysdera chioensis Wunderlich, 1992 — Canary Is.
- Dysdera circularis Deeleman-Reinhold, 1988 — Greece
- Dysdera coiffaiti Denis, 1962 — Madeira
- Dysdera collucata Dunin, 1991 — Armenia
- Dysdera concinna L. Koch, 1878 — Azerbaijan, Iran (?)
- Dysdera corallina Risso, 1826 — Spain, France
- Dysdera corfuensis Deeleman-Reinhold, 1988 — Albania, Greece (Corfu)
- Dysdera cornipes Karsch, 1881 — Libya
- Dysdera cribellata Simon, 1883 — Canary Is.
- Dysdera cribrata Simon, 1882 — France, Italy, Andorra
- Dysdera cristata Deeleman-Reinhold, 1988 — Syria, Lebanon
- Dysdera crocata C. L. Koch, 1838 — Europe, Caucasus, Iraq, Central Asia. Introduced to North America, Chile, Brazil, Australia, New Zealand, Hawaii
- Dysdera crocata mutica Simon, 1911 — Algeria
- Dysdera crocata parvula Simon, 1911 — Algeria
- Dysdera crocolita Simon, 1911 — Algeria
- Dysdera curviseta Wunderlich, 1987 — Canary Is.
- Dysdera cylindrica O. Pickard-Cambridge, 1885 — Pakistan
- Dysdera daghestanica Dunin, 1991 — Russia (Caucasus)
- Dysdera dentichelis Simon, 1882 — Lebanon
- Dysdera deserticola Simon, 1911 — Algeria
- Dysdera diversa Blackwall, 1862 — Madeira
- Dysdera dolanskyi Řezáč, 2018 — Spain
- Dysdera drescoi Ribera, 1983 — Morocco
- Dysdera dubrovninnii Deeleman-Reinhold, 1988 — SE Europe (Balkans), Romania, Slovakia
- Dysdera dunini Deeleman-Reinhold, 1988 — Greece, Turkey, Ukraine, Caucasus (Russia, Georgia, Azerbaijan)
- Dysdera dysderoides (Caporiacco, 1947) — Ethiopia
- Dysdera edumifera Ferrández, 1983 — Spain
- Dysdera enghoffi Arnedo, Oromí & Ribera, 1997 — Canary Is.
- Dysdera enguriensis Deeleman-Reinhold, 1988 — Turkey
- Dysdera erythrina (Walckenaer, 1802) (type) — Southwestern and Western to Central Europe
- Dysdera espanoli Ribera & Ferrández, 1986 — Spain
- Dysdera esquiveli Ribera & Blasco, 1986 — Canary Is.
- Dysdera fabrorum Řezáč, 2018 — Spain
- Dysdera falciformis Barrientos & Ferrández, 1982 — Spain
- Dysdera fedtschenkoi Dunin, 1992 — Tajikistan
- Dysdera ferghanica Dunin, 1985 — Kyrgyzstan
- Dysdera fervida Simon, 1882 — France (Corsica), Spain (Balearic Is.)?
- Dysdera festai Caporiacco, 1929 — Greece (Rhodes)
- Dysdera flagellata Grasshoff, 1959 — Italy
- Dysdera flagellifera Caporiacco, 1947 — Italy
- Dysdera flagellifera aeoliensis Alicata, 1973 — Italy
- Dysdera flavitarsis Simon, 1882 — Spain
- Dysdera fragaria Deeleman-Reinhold, 1988 — Greece (Rhodes)
- Dysdera furcata Varol & Danışman, 2018 — Turkey
- Dysdera fuscipes Simon, 1882 — Portugal, Spain, France
- Dysdera fustigans Alicata, 1966 — Italy
- Dysdera galinae Dimitrov, 2018 — Turkey
- Dysdera gamarrae Ferrández, 1984 — Spain
- Dysdera garrafensis Řezáč, 2018 — Spain
- Dysdera gemina Deeleman-Reinhold, 1988 — Israel
- Dysdera ghilarovi Dunin, 1987 — Azerbaijan
- Dysdera gibbifera Wunderlich, 1992 — Canary Is.
- Dysdera gigas Roewer, 1928 — Greece (Crete)
- Dysdera gmelini Dunin, 1991 — Georgia
- Dysdera gollumi Ribera & Arnedo, 1994 — Canary Is.
- Dysdera gomerensis Strand, 1911 — Canary Is.
- Dysdera graia Řezáč, 2018 — France
- Dysdera granulata Kulczyński, 1897 — Italy, Balkans, Albania
- Dysdera gruberi Deeleman-Reinhold, 1988 — Turkey
- Dysdera guayota Arnedo & Ribera, 1999 — Canary Is.
- Dysdera halkidikii Deeleman-Reinhold, 1988 — Macedonia, Greece
- Dysdera hamifera Simon, 1911 — Algeria
- Dysdera hamifera macellina Simon, 1911 — Algeria
- Dysdera hattusas Deeleman-Reinhold, 1988 — Turkey
- Dysdera helenae Ferrández, 1996 — Spain
- Dysdera hernandezi Arnedo & Ribera, 1999 — Canary Is.
- Dysdera hiemalis Deeleman-Reinhold, 1988 — Greece (Crete)
- Dysdera hirguan Arnedo, Oromí & Ribera, 1997 — Canary Is.
- Dysdera hirsti Denis, 1945 — Algeria
- Dysdera hungarica Kulczyński, 1897 — Central Europe to Azerbaijan
- Dysdera hungarica atra Mcheidze, 1979 — Georgia, Azerbaijan
- Dysdera hungarica subalpina Dunin, 1992 — Russia (Caucasus)
- Dysdera iguanensis Wunderlich, 1987 — Canary Is.
- Dysdera imeretiensis Mcheidze, 1979 — Georgia
- Dysdera incertissima Denis, 1961 — Morocco
- Dysdera incognita Dunin, 1991 — Russia (Europe, Caucasus)
- Dysdera inermis Ferrández, 1984 — Spain
- Dysdera inopinata Dunin, 1991 — Georgia
- Dysdera insulana Simon, 1883 — Canary Is.
- Dysdera jana Gasparo & Arnedo, 2009 — Italy (Sardinia)
- Dysdera karabachica Dunin, 1990 — Azerbaijan
- Dysdera kati Komnenov & Chatzaki, 2016 — Greece
- Dysdera kollari Doblika, 1853 — Italy, Balkans, Greece, Turkey
- Dysdera krisis Komnenov & Chatzaki, 2016 — Greece, Turkey
- Dysdera kronebergi Dunin, 1992 — Tajikistan
- Dysdera kropfi Řezáč, 2018 — Switzerland
- Dysdera kugitangica Dunin, 1992 — Turkmenistan
- Dysdera kulczynskii Simon, 1914 — France, Italy
- Dysdera kusnetsovi Dunin, 1989 — Turkmenistan
- Dysdera labradaensis Wunderlich, 1992 — Canary Is.
- Dysdera lagrecai Alicata, 1964 — Italy
- Dysdera lancerotensis Simon, 1907 — Canary Is.
- Dysdera lantosquensis Simon, 1882 — France, Italy
- Dysdera lata Reuss, 1834 — Mediterranean to Georgia
- Dysdera laterispina Pesarini, 2001 — Greece
- Dysdera leprieuri Simon, 1882 — Algeria
- Dysdera levipes Wunderlich, 1987 — Canary Is.
- Dysdera ligustica Gasparo, 1997 — Italy
- Dysdera limitanea Dunin, 1985 — Turkmenistan
- Dysdera limnos Deeleman-Reinhold, 1988 — Greece
- Dysdera liostetha Simon, 1907 — Canary Is.
- Dysdera littoralis Denis, 1962 — Morocco
- Dysdera longa Wunderlich, 1992 — Canary Is.
- Dysdera longibulbis Denis, 1962 — Madeira
- Dysdera longimandibularis Nosek, 1905 — Turkey, Cyprus
- Dysdera longirostris Doblika, 1853 — Central to southeastern and eastern Europe, Turkey, Caucasus
- Dysdera lubrica Simon, 1907 — Egypt
- Dysdera lucidipes Simon, 1882 — Algeria
- Dysdera lucidipes melillensis Simon, 1911 — Morocco
- Dysdera lusitanica Kulczyński, 1915 — Portugal, Spain
- Dysdera machadoi Ferrández, 1996 — Portugal, Spain
- Dysdera macra Simon, 1883 — Canary Is.
- Dysdera madai Arnedo, 2007 — Canary Is.
- Dysdera mahan Macías-Hernández & Arnedo, 2010 — Canary Is.
- Dysdera maronita Gasparo, 2003 — Lebanon
- Dysdera martensi Dunin, 1991 — Caucasus (Russia, Georgia)
- Dysdera mauritanica Simon, 1909 — Morocco
- Dysdera mauritanica aurantiaca Simon, 1909 — Morocco
- Dysdera maurusia Thorell, 1873 — Algeria, Hungary?, Slovakia?, USA?
- Dysdera mazini Dunin, 1991 — Armenia, Azerbaijan
- Dysdera meschetiensis Mcheidze, 1979 — Georgia
- Dysdera microdonta Gasparo, 2014 — Italy, Austria, Slovenia, Serbia
- Dysdera minairo Řezáč, 2018 — Spain
- Dysdera minuta Deeleman-Reinhold, 1988 — Greece (Rhodes)
- Dysdera minutissima Wunderlich, 1992 — Canary Is.
- Dysdera mixta Deeleman-Reinhold, 1988 — Turkey
- Dysdera montanetensis Wunderlich, 1992 — Canary Is.
- Dysdera monterossoi Alicata, 1964 — Italy
- Dysdera moravica Řezáč, 2014 — Germany to Romania
- Dysdera mucronata Simon, 1911 — Morocco, Spain
- Dysdera murphyorum Deeleman-Reinhold, 1988 — Albania, Greece (Corfu)
- Dysdera nakhchivanica Beydizade, Shafaie & Guseinov, 2018 — Azerbaijan
- Dysdera nenilini Dunin, 1989 — Turkmenistan
- Dysdera neocretica Deeleman-Reinhold, 1988 — Greece (Crete), Turkey
- Dysdera nesiotes Simon, 1907 — Selvagens Is., Canary Is.
- Dysdera nicaeensis Thorell, 1873 — France, Italy
- Dysdera ninnii Canestrini, 1868 — Switzerland, Italy, Slovenia, Croatia
- Dysdera nomada Simon, 1911 — Tunisia
- Dysdera nubila Simon, 1882 — France (Corsica), Italy
- Dysdera orahan Arnedo, Oromí & Ribera, 1997 — Canary Is.
- Dysdera ortunoi Ferrández, 1996 — Spain
- Dysdera osellai Alicata, 1973 — Italy
- Dysdera paganettii Deeleman-Reinhold, 1988 — Italy
- Dysdera pamirica Dunin, 1992 — Tajikistan
- Dysdera pandazisi Hadjissarantos, 1940 — Greece
- Dysdera paucispinosa Wunderlich, 1992 — Canary Is.
- Dysdera pavani Caporiacco, 1941 — Italy
- Dysdera pectinata Deeleman-Reinhold, 1988 — Bulgaria, Macedonia, Greece
- Dysdera pharaonis Simon, 1907 — Egypt
- Dysdera pococki Dunin, 1985 — Turkmenistan
- Dysdera pominii Caporiacco, 1947 — Italy
- Dysdera portisancti Wunderlich, 1995 — Madeira
- Dysdera portsensis Řezáč, 2018 — Spain
- Dysdera pradesensis Řezáč, 2018 — Spain
- Dysdera praepostera Denis, 1961 — Morocco
- Dysdera presai Ferrández, 1984 — Spain
- Dysdera pretneri Deeleman-Reinhold, 1988 — Croatia, Montenegro, Greece
- Dysdera pristiphora Pesarini, 2001 — Italy
- Dysdera punctata C. L. Koch, 1838 — Southern Europe, Slovakia?, Georgia?
- Dysdera punctocretica Deeleman-Reinhold, 1988 — Greece (Corfu)
- Dysdera pyrenaica Řezáč, 2018 — Spain
- Dysdera quindecima Řezáč, 2018 — Spain
- Dysdera raddei Dunin, 1990 — Azerbaijan
- Dysdera ramblae Arnedo, Oromí & Ribera, 1997 — Canary Is.
- Dysdera ratonensis Wunderlich, 1992 — Canary Is.
- Dysdera ravida Simon, 1909 — Morocco
- Dysdera richteri Charitonov, 1956 — Azerbaijan, Armenia, Georgia
- Dysdera roemeri Strand, 1906 — Ethiopia
- Dysdera romana Gasparo & Di Franco, 2008 — Italy
- Dysdera romantica Deeleman-Reinhold, 1988 — Greece
- Dysdera rostrata Denis, 1961 — Morocco
- Dysdera rubus Deeleman-Reinhold, 1988 — Turkey, Greece
- Dysdera rudis Simon, 1882 — France
- Dysdera rugichelis Simon, 1907 — Canary Is.
- Dysdera rullii Pesarini, 2001 — Italy
- Dysdera sanborondon Arnedo, Oromí & Ribera, 2000 — Canary Is.
- Dysdera satunini Dunin, 1990 — Azerbaijan
- Dysdera scabricula Simon, 1882 — France, Spain
- Dysdera sciakyi Pesarini, 2001 — Greece
- Dysdera seclusa Denis, 1961 — Morocco
- Dysdera sefrensis Simon, 1911 — Morocco
- Dysdera septima Řezáč, 2018 — Spain
- Dysdera shardana Opatova & Arnedo, 2009 — Italy (Sardinia)
- Dysdera sibyllina Arnedo, 2007 — Canary Is.
- Dysdera sibyllinica Kritscher, 1956 — Italy
- Dysdera silana Alicata, 1965 — Italy
- Dysdera silvatica Schmidt, 1981 — Canary Is.
- Dysdera simbeque Macías-Hernández & Arnedo, 2010 — Canary Is.
- Dysdera simoni Deeleman-Reinhold, 1988 — Syria, Israel, Lebanon
- Dysdera snassenica Simon, 1911 — Morocco, Algeria
- Dysdera snassenica collina Simon, 1911 — Morocco
- Dysdera soleata Karsch, 1881 — Libya
- Dysdera solers Walckenaer, 1837 — Colombia
- Dysdera spasskyi Charitonov, 1956 — Georgia
- Dysdera spinicrus Simon, 1882 — Balkans, Greece, Syria
- Dysdera spinidorsa Wunderlich, 1992 — Canary Is.
- Dysdera stahlavskyi Řezáč, 2018 — France
- Dysdera subcylindrica Charitonov, 1956 — Central Asia
- Dysdera subnubila Simon, 1907 — Italy, Tunisia, Egypt
- Dysdera subsquarrosa Simon, 1914 — France, Italy
- Dysdera sultani Deeleman-Reinhold, 1988 — Greece, Turkey
- Dysdera sutoria Denis, 1945 — Morocco
- Dysdera tartarica Kroneberg, 1875 — Central Asia
- Dysdera tbilisiensis Mcheidze, 1979 — Georgia
- Dysdera tenuistyla Denis, 1961 — Morocco
- Dysdera tezcani Varol & Akpınar, 2016 — Turkey
- Dysdera tilosensis Wunderlich, 1992 — Canary Is.
- Dysdera topcui Gasparo, 2008 — Turkey
- Dysdera tredecima Řezáč, 2018 — Spain
- Dysdera turcica Varol, 2016 — Turkey
- Dysdera tystshenkoi Dunin, 1989 — Turkmenistan
- Dysdera ukrainensis Charitonov, 1956 — Ukraine, Russia (Europe), Georgia
- Dysdera undecima Řezáč, 2018 — Spain
- Dysdera unguimmanis Ribera, Ferrández & Blasco, 1986 — Canary Is.
- Dysdera valentina Ribera, 2004 — Spain
- Dysdera vandeli Denis, 1962 — Madeira
- Dysdera veigai Ferrández, 1984 — Spain
- Dysdera ventricosa Grasshoff, 1959 — Italy
- Dysdera vermicularis Berland, 1936 — Cape Verde Is.
- Dysdera verneaui Simon, 1883 — Canary Is.
- Dysdera vesiculifera Simon, 1882 — Algeria
- Dysdera vignai Gasparo, 2003 — Lebanon
- Dysdera vivesi Ribera & Ferrández, 1986 — Spain
- Dysdera volcania Ribera, Ferrández & Blasco, 1986 — Canary Is.
- Dysdera werneri Deeleman-Reinhold, 1988 — Greece
- Dysdera westringi O. Pickard-Cambridge, 1872 — Eastern Mediterranean, Iraq
- Dysdera yguanirae Arnedo & Ribera, 1997 — Canary Is.
- Dysdera yozgat Deeleman-Reinhold, 1988 — Turkey
- Dysdera zarudnyi Charitonov, 1956 — Central Asia, Afghanistan

=== Dysderella ===
Dysderella Dunin, 1992

- Dysderella caspica (Dunin, 1990) — Azerbaijan
- Dysderella transcaspica (Dunin & Fet, 1985) (type) — Turkmenistan, Iran

=== Dysderocrates ===
Dysderocrates Deeleman-Reinhold & Deeleman, 1988

- Dysderocrates egregius (Kulczyński, 1897) — Hungary, Romania
- Dysderocrates gasparoi Deeleman-Reinhold, 1988 — Greece (Corfu)
- Dysderocrates kibrisensis Gücel, Charalambidou, Göçmen & Kunt, 2019 — Cyprus
- Dysderocrates marani (Kratochvíl, 1937) — Greece (Crete)
- Dysderocrates regina Deeleman-Reinhold, 1988 — Turkey
- Dysderocrates silvestris Deeleman-Reinhold, 1988 — Bosnia-Hercegovina, Montenegro
- Dysderocrates storkani (Kratochvíl, 1935) (type) — SE Europe (Balkans)
- Dysderocrates tanatmisi Karakaş Kiliç & Özkütük, 2017 — Turkey

== F ==
=== Folkia ===
Folkia Kratochvíl, 1970

- Folkia boudewijni Deeleman-Reinhold, 1993 — Croatia
- Folkia haasi (Reimoser, 1929) — Croatia
- Folkia inermis (Absolon & Kratochvíl, 1933) (type) — Croatia
- Folkia lugens Brignoli, 1974 — Greece
- Folkia mrazeki (Nosek, 1904) — Montenegro
- Folkia pauciaculeata (Fage, 1943) — Bosnia-Hercegovina
- Folkia subcupressa Deeleman-Reinhold, 1993 — Croatia

== H ==
=== Harpactea ===
Harpactea

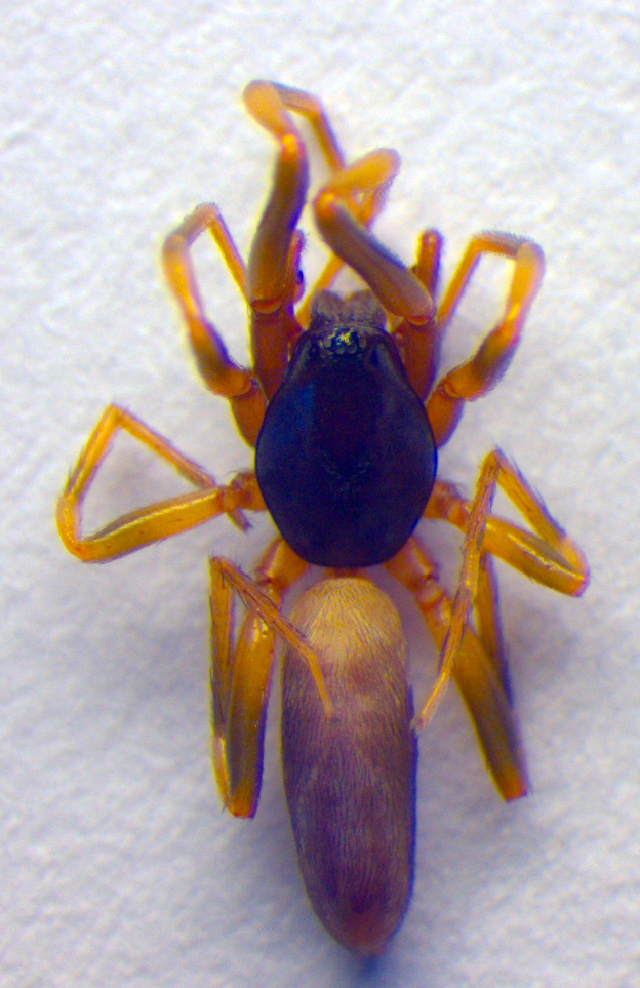
Harpactea hombergi

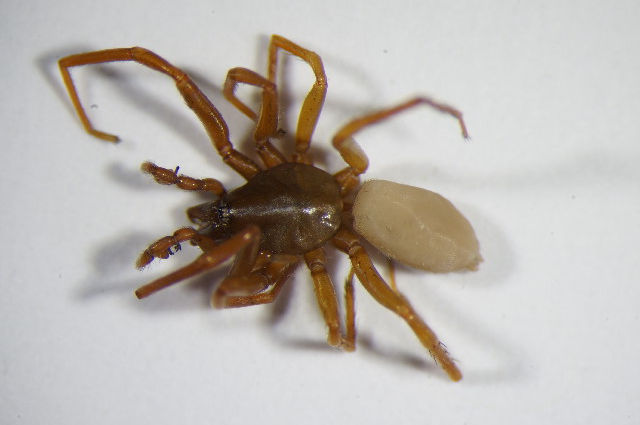
Harpactea lepida

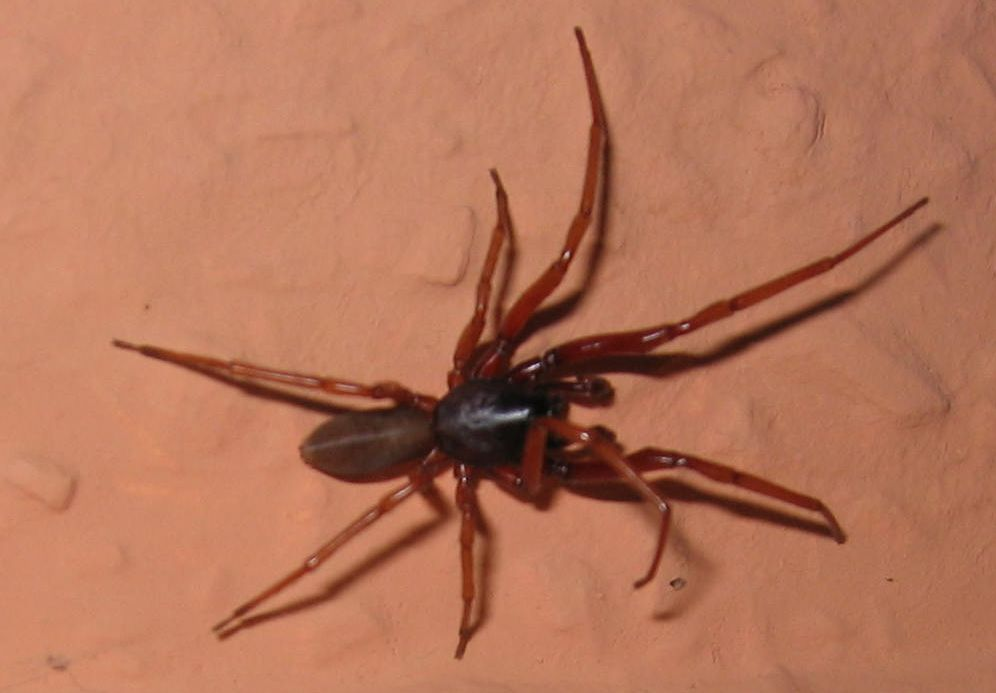
Harpactea rubicunda

Harpactea Bristowe, 1939

- Harpactea abantia (Simon, 1884) — Greece
- Harpactea achsuensis Dunin, 1991 — Azerbaijan
- Harpactea acuta Beladjal & Bosmans, 1997 — Algeria
- Harpactea aeoliensis Alicata, 1973 — Italy
- Harpactea agnolettii Brignoli, 1978 — Turkey
- Harpactea alanyana Özkütük, Elverici, Marusik & Kunt, 2015 — Turkey
- Harpactea albanica (Caporiacco, 1949) — Albania
- Harpactea alexandrae Lazarov, 2006 — Bulgaria, Romania, Ukraine, Russia (Europe)
- Harpactea algarvensis Ferrández, 1990 — Portugal
- Harpactea alicatai Brignoli, 1979 — Italy (Sardinia)
- Harpactea angustata (Lucas, 1846) — Algeria
- Harpactea antoni Bosmans, 2009 — Greece
- Harpactea apollinea Brignoli, 1979 — Greece
- Harpactea arguta (Simon, 1907) — France, Italy
- Harpactea armenica Dunin, 1989 — Armenia
- Harpactea arnedoi Kunt, Elverici, Özkütük & Yağmur, 2011 — Turkey
- Harpactea asparuhi Lazarov, 2008 — Bulgaria
- Harpactea auresensis Bosmans & Beladjal, 1991 — Algeria
- Harpactea auriga (Simon, 1911) — Algeria
- Harpactea aurigoides Bosmans & Beladjal, 1991 — Algeria
- Harpactea azerbajdzhanica Dunin, 1991 — Azerbaijan
- Harpactea azowensis Charitonov, 1956 — Ukraine, Russia (Europe)
- Harpactea babori (Nosek, 1905) — Bulgaria, Greece, Turkey
- Harpactea ballarini Kunt, Özkütük & Elverici, 2013 — Turkey
- Harpactea blasi Ribera & Ferrández, 1986 — Spain
- Harpactea buchari Dunin, 1991 — Azerbaijan
- Harpactea bulgarica Lazarov & Naumova, 2010 — Macedonia, Bulgaria
- Harpactea caligata Beladjal & Bosmans, 1997 — Algeria
- Harpactea carusoi Alicata, 1974 — Italy, Tunisia
- Harpactea catholica (Brignoli, 1984) — Greece (Crete)
- Harpactea caucasia (Kulczyński, 1895) — Russia (Caucasus), Georgia
- Harpactea cecconii (Kulczyński, 1908) — Cyprus
- Harpactea cesari Van Keer, 2009 — Greece
- Harpactea chreensis Bosmans & Beladjal, 1989 — Algeria
- Harpactea christae Bosmans & Beladjal, 1991 — Algeria
- Harpactea christodeltshevi Bayram, Kunt & Yağmur, 2009 — Turkey
- Harpactea clementi Bosmans, 2009 — Greece, Turkey
- Harpactea coccifera Brignoli, 1984 — Greece (Crete)
- Harpactea colchidis Brignoli, 1978 — Turkey
- Harpactea complicata Deltshev, 2011 — Serbia
- Harpactea corinthia Brignoli, 1984 — Greece
- Harpactea corticalis (Simon, 1882) — France, Italy
- Harpactea cressa Brignoli, 1984 — Greece (Crete)
- Harpactea cruriformis Bosmans, 2011 — Greece
- Harpactea dashdamirovi Dunin, 1993 — Azerbaijan
- Harpactea deelemanae Dunin, 1989 — Armenia
- Harpactea deltshevi Dimitrov & Lazarov, 1999 — Bulgaria
- Harpactea digiovannii Gasparo, 2014 — Greece
- Harpactea diraoi Brignoli, 1978 — Turkey
- Harpactea dobati Alicata, 1974 — Turkey
- Harpactea doblikae (Thorell, 1875) — Ukraine (mainland, Crimea)
- Harpactea dufouri (Thorell, 1873) — Spain
- Harpactea dumonti Bosmans & Beladjal, 1991 — Algeria
- Harpactea eskovi Dunin, 1989 — Georgia, Armenia
- Harpactea fageli Brignoli, 1980 — Portugal, Spain
- Harpactea forceps Varol & Danışman, 2018 — Turkey
- Harpactea forcipifera (Simon, 1911) — Algeria
- Harpactea gaditana Pesarini, 1988 — Spain
- Harpactea galatica Brignoli, 1978 — Turkey
- Harpactea gennargentu Wunderlich, 1995 — Italy (Sardinia)
- Harpactea globifera (Simon, 1911) — Algeria
- Harpactea golovatchi Dunin, 1989 — Armenia
- Harpactea gridellii (Caporiacco, 1951) — Italy
- Harpactea grisea (Canestrini, 1868) — Switzerland, Austria, Italy, Slovenia
- Harpactea gunselorum Gücel, Fuller, Göçmen & Kunt, 2018 — Cyprus
- Harpactea hauseri Brignoli, 1976 — Greece
- Harpactea heizerensis Bosmans & Beladjal, 1991 — Algeria
- Harpactea heliconia Brignoli, 1984 — Greece
- Harpactea henschi (Kulczyński, 1915) — Bosnia-Hercegovina
- Harpactea herodis Brignoli, 1978 — Israel
- Harpactea hispana (Simon, 1882) — Spain, France
- Harpactea hombergi (Scopoli, 1763) (type) — Europe
- Harpactea hyrcanica Dunin, 1991 — Azerbaijan
- Harpactea ice Komnenov & Chatzaki, 2016 — Greece
- Harpactea incerta Brignoli, 1979 — Greece
- Harpactea incurvata Bosmans & Beladjal, 1991 — Algeria
- Harpactea indistincta Dunin, 1991 — Russia (Caucasus), Azerbaijan
- Harpactea innupta Beladjal & Bosmans, 1997 — Algeria
- Harpactea isaurica Brignoli, 1978 — Turkey
- Harpactea johannitica Brignoli, 1976 — Greece
- Harpactea kalaensis Beladjal & Bosmans, 1997 — Algeria
- Harpactea kalavachiana Gücel, Charalambidou, Göçmen & Kunt, 2019 — Cyprus
- Harpactea karabachica Dunin, 1991 — Azerbaijan
- Harpactea karaschkhan Kunt, Özkütük, Elverici, Marusik & Karakaş, 2016 — Turkey
- Harpactea kareli Bosmans & Beladjal, 1991 — Algeria
- Harpactea kencei Kunt, Elverici, Özkütük & Yağmur, 2011 — Turkey
- Harpactea konradi Lazarov, 2009 — Bulgaria
- Harpactea korgei Brignoli, 1979 — Turkey
- Harpactea krueperi (Simon, 1884) — Greece
- Harpactea krumi Lazarov, 2010 — Bulgaria
- Harpactea kubrati Lazarov, 2008 — Bulgaria
- Harpactea kulczynskii Brignoli, 1976 — Greece
- Harpactea lazarovi Deltshev, 2011 — Bulgaria
- Harpactea lazonum Brignoli, 1978 — Turkey
- Harpactea lepida (C. L. Koch, 1838) — Europe
- Harpactea loebli Brignoli, 1974 — Greece
- Harpactea logunovi Dunin, 1992 — Russia (Caucasus), Georgia
- Harpactea longitarsa Alicata, 1974 — Algeria, Tunisia
- Harpactea longobarda Pesarini, 2001 — Italy, Ukraine
- Harpactea maelfaiti Beladjal & Bosmans, 1997 — Algeria
- Harpactea magnibulbi Machado & Ferrández, 1991 — Portugal
- Harpactea major (Simon, 1911) — Algeria
- Harpactea mariae Komnenov, 2014 — Macedonia
- Harpactea martensi Dunin, 1991 — Azerbaijan
- Harpactea mcheidzeae Dunin, 1992 — Georgia
- Harpactea medeae Brignoli, 1978 — Turkey
- Harpactea mehennii Bosmans & Beladjal, 1989 — Algeria
- Harpactea mentor Lazarov & Naumova, 2010 — Bulgaria
- Harpactea mertensi Bosmans & Beladjal, 1991 — Algeria
- Harpactea minoccii Ferrández, 1982 — Spain
- Harpactea minuta Alicata, 1974 — Tunisia
- Harpactea mithridatis Brignoli, 1979 — Turkey, Georgia
- Harpactea mitidjae Bosmans & Beladjal, 1991 — Algeria
- Harpactea modesta Dunin, 1991 — Russia (Caucasus), Azerbaijan
- Harpactea monicae Bosmans & Beladjal, 1991 — Algeria
- Harpactea mouzaiensis Bosmans & Beladjal, 1989 — Algeria
- Harpactea muscicola (Simon, 1882) — France (Corsica)
- Harpactea nachitschevanica Dunin, 1991 — Azerbaijan
- Harpactea nausicaae Brignoli, 1976 — Macedonia, Greece
- Harpactea nenilini Dunin, 1989 — Armenia
- Harpactea nuragica Alicata, 1966 — Italy (Sardinia)
- Harpactea oglasana Gasparo, 1992 — Italy
- Harpactea oranensis Bosmans & Beladjal, 1991 — Algeria
- Harpactea ortegai Ribera & De Mas, 2003 — Spain
- Harpactea osellai Brignoli, 1978 — Turkey
- Harpactea ouarsenensis Bosmans & Beladjal, 1991 — Algeria
- Harpactea ovata Beladjal & Bosmans, 1997 — Algeria
- Harpactea paradoxa Dunin, 1992 — Georgia
- Harpactea parthica Brignoli, 1980 — Iran, Turkmenistan?
- Harpactea persephone Gasparo, 2011 — Greece (Crete)
- Harpactea petrovi Lazarov & Dimitrov, 2018 — Bulgaria
- Harpactea piligera (Thorell, 1875) — Italy
- Harpactea pisidica Brignoli, 1978 — Turkey
- Harpactea popovi Dimitrov, Deltshev & Lazarov, 2019 — Bulgaria
- Harpactea proxima Ferrández, 1990 — Portugal
- Harpactea pugio Varol & Akpınar, 2016 — Turkey
- Harpactea punica Alicata, 1974 — Algeria, Tunisia
- Harpactea reniformis Beladjal & Bosmans, 1997 — Algeria
- Harpactea rubicunda (C. L. Koch, 1838) — Europe, Georgia
- Harpactea rucnerorum Polenec & Thaler, 1975 — Croatia
- Harpactea ruffoi Alicata, 1974 — Tunisia
- Harpactea rugichelis Denis, 1955 — Lebanon
- Harpactea sadistica Řezáč, 2008 — Israel
- Harpactea saeva (Herman, 1879) — Slovakia, Hungary, southeastern Europe to Ukraine
- Harpactea samuili Lazarov, 2006 — Bulgaria
- Harpactea sanctaeinsulae Brignoli, 1978 — Turkey
- Harpactea sanctidomini Gasparo, 1997 — Italy
- Harpactea sardoa Alicata, 1966 — Italy
- Harpactea sbordonii Brignoli, 1978 — Turkey
- Harpactea sciakyi Pesarini, 1988 — Spain
- Harpactea secunda Dunin, 1989 — Armenia
- Harpactea senalbensis Beladjal & Bosmans, 1997 — Algeria
- Harpactea serena (Simon, 1907) — Spain, France
- Harpactea sicula Alicata, 1966 — Italy (Sicily)
- Harpactea simovi Deltshev & Lazarov, 2018 — Bulgaria
- Harpactea sinuata Beladjal & Bosmans, 1997 — Algeria
- Harpactea spasskyi Dunin, 1992 — Ukraine (Crimea), Russia (Caucasus)
- Harpactea spirembolus Russell-Smith, 2011 — Greece
- Harpactea srednagora Dimitrov & Lazarov, 1999 — Macedonia, Bulgaria
- Harpactea stalitoides Ribera, 1993 — Portugal
- Harpactea stoevi Deltshev & Lazarov, 2018 — Bulgaria
- Harpactea strandi (Caporiacco, 1939) — Italy
- Harpactea strandjica Dimitrov, 1997 — Bulgaria, Turkey
- Harpactea strinatii Brignoli, 1979 — Greece
- Harpactea sturanyi (Nosek, 1905) — Greece, Turkey, Georgia
- Harpactea subiasi Ferrández, 1990 — Portugal
- Harpactea talyschica Dunin, 1991 — Azerbaijan
- Harpactea tenuiemboli Deltshev, 2011 — Serbia
- Harpactea tergestina Gasparo, 2014 — Italy
- Harpactea terveli Lazarov, 2009 — Bulgaria, Turkey
- Harpactea thaleri Alicata, 1966 — Switzerland, Italy
- Harpactea undosa Beladjal & Bosmans, 1997 — Algeria
- Harpactea vagabunda Dunin, 1991 — Azerbaijan
- Harpactea vignai Brignoli, 1978 — Turkey
- Harpactea villehardouini Brignoli, 1979 — Greece
- Harpactea wolfgangi Komnenov & Chatzaki, 2016 — Greece
- Harpactea yakourensis Beladjal & Bosmans, 1997 — Algeria
- Harpactea zaitzevi Charitonov, 1956 — Georgia, Azerbaijan, Armenia
- Harpactea zannonensis Alicata, 1966 — Italy
- Harpactea zjuzini Dunin, 1991 — Azerbaijan
- Harpactea zoiai Gasparo, 1999 — Greece

=== Harpactocrates ===
Harpactocrates Simon, 1914

- Harpactocrates apennicola Simon, 1914 — France, Italy
- Harpactocrates cazorlensis Ferrández, 1986 — Spain
- Harpactocrates drassoides (Simon, 1882) (type) — Western Europe
- Harpactocrates escuderoi Ferrández, 1986 — Spain
- Harpactocrates globifer Ferrández, 1986 — Spain
- Harpactocrates gredensis Ferrández, 1986 — Spain
- Harpactocrates gurdus Simon, 1914 — Spain, France
- Harpactocrates intermedius Dalmas, 1915 — France, Italy
- Harpactocrates meridionalis Ferrández & Martin, 1986 — Spain
- Harpactocrates radulifer Simon, 1914 — Spain, France
- Harpactocrates ravastellus Simon, 1914 — Spain, France
- Harpactocrates trialetiensis Mcheidze, 1997 — Georgia
- Harpactocrates troglophilus Brignoli, 1978 — Turkey

=== Holissus ===
Holissus Simon, 1882

- Holissus unciger Simon, 1882 (type) — France (Corsica)

=== Hygrocrates ===
Hygrocrates Deeleman-Reinhold, 1988

- Hygrocrates caucasicus Dunin, 1992 — Georgia
- Hygrocrates deelemanus Kunt & Yağmur, 2011 — Turkey
- Hygrocrates georgicus (Mcheidze, 1972) — Georgia
- Hygrocrates kovblyuki Kunt & Marusik, 2013 — Turkey
- Hygrocrates lycaoniae (Brignoli, 1978) (type) — Greece (Rhodes), Turkey

== K ==
=== Kaemis ===
Kaemis Deeleman-Reinhold, 1993

- Kaemis aeruginosus (Barrientos, Espuny & Ascaso, 1994) — Spain
- Kaemis carnicus Gasparo, 1995 — Italy
- Kaemis circe (Brignoli, 1975) — Italy
- Kaemis gasparoi Mazzoleni & Pantini, 2018 — Italy
- Kaemis vernalis Deeleman-Reinhold, 1993 (type) — Montenegro

== M ==
=== Mesostalita ===
Mesostalita Deeleman-Reinhold, 1971

- Mesostalita comottii (Gasparo, 1999) — Croatia
- Mesostalita kratochvili Deeleman-Reinhold, 1971 (type) — Bosnia-Hercegovina
- Mesostalita nocturna (Roewer, 1931) — Italy, Slovenia

=== Minotauria ===
Minotauria Kulczyński, 1903

- Minotauria attemsi Kulczyński, 1903 (type) — Greece (Crete)
- Minotauria fagei (Kratochvíl, 1970) — Greece (Crete)

== P ==
=== Parachtes ===
Parachtes Alicata, 1964

- Parachtes andreinii Alicata, 1966 — Italy
- Parachtes cantabrorum (Simon, 1914) — Spain, France
- Parachtes deminutus (Denis, 1957) — Spain
- Parachtes ignavus (Simon, 1882) — Spain, France (mainland, Corsica)
- Parachtes inaequipes (Simon, 1882) — France (Corsica)
- Parachtes latialis Alicata, 1966 — Italy
- Parachtes limbarae (Kraus, 1955) — Sardinia
- Parachtes loboi Jiménez-Valverde, Barriga & Moreno, 2006 — Spain
- Parachtes riberai Bosmans, 2017 — Spain (Majorca)
- Parachtes romandiolae (Caporiacco, 1949) — Italy
- Parachtes siculus (Caporiacco, 1949) — Italy
- Parachtes teruelis (Kraus, 1955) — Spain
- Parachtes vernae (Caporiacco, 1936) (type) — Italy

=== Parastalita ===
Parastalita Absolon & Kratochvíl, 1932

- Parastalita stygia (Joseph, 1882) (type) — Bosnia-Hercegovina

== R ==
=== Rhode ===
Rhode Simon, 1882

- Rhode aspinifera (Nikolic, 1963) — Slovenia
- Rhode baborensis Beladjal & Bosmans, 1996 — Algeria
- Rhode biscutata Simon, 1893 — Mediterranean
- Rhode magnifica Deeleman-Reinhold, 1978 — Montenegro
- Rhode scutiventris Simon, 1882 (type) — Portugal, Spain, Morocco, Algeria
- Rhode stalitoides Deeleman-Reinhold, 1978 — Bosnia-Hercegovina
- Rhode subterranea (Kratochvíl, 1935) — Bosnia-Hercegovina
- Rhode tenuipes (Simon, 1882) — France (Corsica)
- Rhode testudinea Pesarini, 1984 — Italy

=== Rhodera ===
Rhodera Deeleman-Reinhold, 1989

- Rhodera hypogea Deeleman-Reinhold, 1989 (type) — Greece (Crete)

== S ==
=== Sardostalita ===
Sardostalita Gasparo, 1999

- Sardostalita patrizii (Roewer, 1956) (type) — Sardinia

=== Speleoharpactea ===
Speleoharpactea Ribera, 1982

- Speleoharpactea levantina Ribera, 1982 (type) — Spain

=== Stalagtia ===
Stalagtia Kratochvíl, 1970

- Stalagtia argus Brignoli, 1976 — Greece
- Stalagtia christoi Van Keer & Bosmans, 2009 — Greece
- Stalagtia hercegovinensis (Nosek, 1905) (type) — SE Europe (Balkans), Turkey
- Stalagtia kratochvili Brignoli, 1976 — Greece
- Stalagtia monospina (Absolon & Kratochvíl, 1933) — Montenegro
- Stalagtia skadarensis Kratochvíl, 1970 — Montenegro
- Stalagtia thaleriana Chatzaki & Arnedo, 2006 — Greece (Crete), Turkey

=== Stalita ===
Stalita Schiödte, 1847

- Stalita hadzii Kratochvíl, 1934 — Slovenia
- Stalita inermifemur Roewer, 1931 — Slovenia, Croatia
- Stalita pretneri Deeleman-Reinhold, 1971 — Croatia
- Stalita taenaria Schiödte, 1847 (type) — Italy, Slovenia, Croatia

=== Stalitella ===
Stalitella Absolon & Kratochvíl, 1932

- Stalitella noseki Absolon & Kratochvíl, 1933 (type) — Bosnia-Hercegovina, Montenegro

=== Stalitochara ===
Stalitochara Simon, 1913

- Stalitochara kabiliana Simon, 1913 (type) — Algeria

== T ==
=== Tedia ===
Tedia Simon, 1882

- Tedia abdominalis Deeleman-Reinhold, 1988 — Israel, Syria
- Tedia oxygnatha Simon, 1882 (type) — Syria, Iran?
