= Dysdera kurdistanica =

Scientific classification
- Kingdom: Animalia
- Phylum: Arthropoda
- Subphylum: Chelicerata
- Class: Arachnida
- Order: Araneae
- Infraorder: Araneomorphae
- Family: Dysderidae
- Genus: Dysdera
- Species: D. kurdistanica

Binomial name
- Dysdera kurdistanica Zamani et al., 2024

Species of spider

Dysdera kurdistanica is a species of small spider in the family Dysderidae. It is first formally described by Zamani et al. in 2024, while the group was documenting the spider fauna of Iraqi Kurdistan. The species is known from Sulaymaniyah Governorate in the Kurdistan Region, Iraq.

== Description ==
Kurdistanica is known from a male specimen, which measures approximately 4.87 mm in total length. Its carapace measures 2.03 mm in length and 1.54 mm in width. The carapace, sternum, chelicerae, labium and maxillae are light reddish brown, while the legs are yellowish and the abdomen is light beige without any distinctive pattern.

The male can be distinguished from other members of the genus Dysdera by the structure of its copulatory organ, particularly its strongly bent posterior apophysis, a long stylus that exceeds the length of the crest, and a distinctive spermaphor that forms several loops rather than a spiral coil.

== Distribution ==
Dysdera kurdistanica is known only from its type locality in Sulaymaniyah Governorate, Iraqi Kurdistan. The holotype was collected at Dekon Village, near Hazar Merd, in the Bakrajo area on15 April 2023.

== Taxonomy ==
The species was formally described by Alireza Zamani and Yuri M. Marusik in a 2024 paper co-authored with Farhad A. Khudhur and published in the scientific journal Zootaxa. The description was based on a male holotype deposited in the Zoological Museum of the University of Turku, Finland.

The specific epithet kurdistanica refers to the Kurdistan region, where the species was discovered.
