= Dysdera algarvensis =

Scientific classification
- Kingdom: Animalia
- Phylum: Arthropoda
- Subphylum: Chelicerata
- Class: Arachnida
- Order: Araneae
- Infraorder: Araneomorphae
- Family: Dysderidae
- Genus: Dysdera
- Species: D. algarvensis

Binomial name
- Dysdera algarvensis Wunderlich, 2023

Species of spider

Dysdera algarvensis is a species of spider described in 2023 by arachnologist Jörg Wunderlich from specimens collected in the Algarve region of southern Portugal.

== Taxonomy ==
Dysdera algarvensis belongs to the genus Dysdera, in the family Dysderidae and the order Araneae. The specific epithet 'algarvensis' refers to the Algarve, the geographical region in Portugal where the species was discovered.

== Description ==
The male has a body length of approximately 6.0 mm, while females measure between 7.3 and 11.0 mm.
