= Dysdera goyzha =

Scientific classification
- Kingdom: Animalia
- Phylum: Arthropoda
- Subphylum: Chelicerata
- Class: Arachnida
- Order: Araneae
- Infraorder: Araneomorphae
- Family: Dysderidae
- Genus: Dysdera
- Species: D. goyzha

Binomial name
- Dysdera goyzha Zamani et al, 2024

Species of spider

Dysdera goyzha is a species of spider in the family Dysderidae. It was described in 2024 as part of a study documenting the spider fauna of Iraqi Kurdistan.

== Etymology ==
The species is known from Goyzha Mountain in Sulaymaniyah, and hence the name Goyzha.

== Taxonomy ==
Dysdera goyzha belongs to the genus Dysdera, in the family Dysderidae and the order Araneae. It was formally described in 2024 by Zamani, Khudhur and Marusik in a paper published in Zootaxa.
