= Dysdera arganoi =

Scientific classification
- Kingdom: Animalia
- Phylum: Arthropoda
- Subphylum: Chelicerata
- Class: Arachnida
- Order: Araneae
- Infraorder: Araneomorphae
- Family: Dysderidae
- Genus: Dysdera
- Species: D. arganoi

Binomial name
- Dysdera arganoi Gasparo, 2004

Species of spider

Dysdera arganoi is a spider species from the family Dysderidae that is endemic to Italy.
