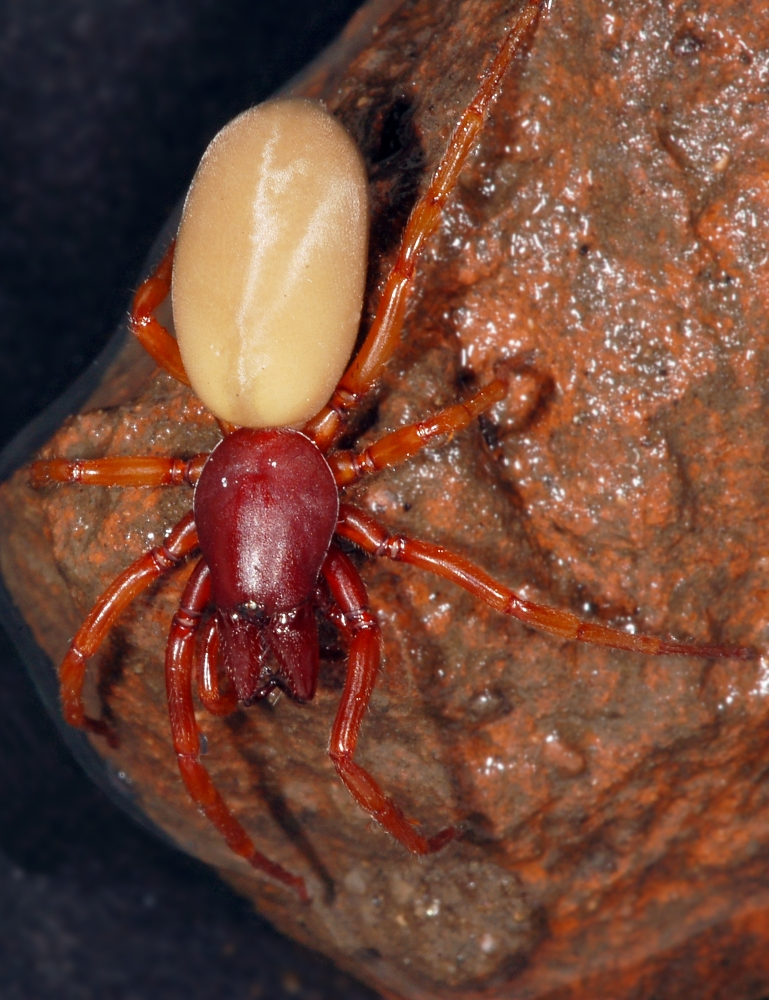
- Dysdera erythrina

Scientific classification
- Kingdom: Animalia
- Phylum: Arthropoda
- Subphylum: Chelicerata
- Class: Arachnida
- Order: Araneae
- Infraorder: Araneomorphae
- Family: Dysderidae
- Genus: Dysdera; Latreille, 1804

Type species
- D. erythrina (Walckenaer, 1802)

Species
- 297, see text

= Dysdera =

Dysdera Temporal range: Palaeogene–present

Genus of spiders

Dysdera is a genus of woodlouse hunting spiders that was first described by Pierre André Latreille in 1804. They originated from Central Asia to Central Europe.

The family has gained many common names from their individual species, including the "European garden spider", the "slater-eating spider", the "sow-bug killer", the "woodlouse hunter", and the "woodlouse spider".

A bite from one of these spiders can be painful due to their large fangs and wide jaw. It may leave an itchy, swollen, or red bump, but the venom from one of their bites is not harmful to humans.

== Description ==
The eye arrangement of spiders in the genus Dysdera

Adults have a reddish-brown body and legs, and can grow up to 2 centimetres (0.79 in) long. Females are generally larger growing from 1.1 to 1.5 centimetres (0.43 to 0.59 in), while males are about 0.9 to 1 centimetre (0.35 to 0.39 in). Their six eyes are close together in an oval shape, and they have eight reddish legs, the second pair facing backward.

Dysdera live in natural shelters, which they completely wrap in white silk. Inhabitants of short grasslands in England and dry forests of the Mediterranean, the spiders will take any potential shelter on or close to the ground; the shelters are used to hide from predators as well as for keeping the spider warm. During the day, they are commonly found taking shelter under objects like gravel with organic material covering it, in forests beneath bark or leaf litter, and occasionally in suburban gardens.

=== Diet ===
Dysdera are one of the few known arthropods to hunt and prey on woodlice, one of their main food sources. These spiders have wide jaws and large fangs to help to overcome the solid armor-like shells of woodlice. It makes them powerful predators for their size, allowing them to dominate or kill competitors, such as centipedes or other spiders. D. crocata is the only species from the Dysdera family known to prey on other spiders.

=== Mating ===
Mating is mainly done during the month of April. The female is the main caregiver for the young. After mating, the male has minimal to no role in the child rearing process. Before laying the eggs, females will make a silk pouch to protect and give them shelter. She can lay up to seventy eggs at once, and will stay in the silk pouch with the eggs, protecting them and waiting for them to hatch.

== Distribution ==
D. crocata, D. ninnii, D. dubrovninnii, D. hungarica, and D. longirostris are the five species still found in Central Europe after the last glacial period. They are also abundantly found in North African countries like Morocco and Egypt, but also in Ethiopia, the Iberian Peninsula, and Australia. In the United States, D. crocata is the only species present, and is found from New England down to Georgia, and all the way across the country in California. At least two species inhabit South America: D. solers in Colombia – possibly a relict species from the post-miocene era – and D. magna in Brazil, Uruguay, and the central area of Chile.

=== Canary Islands ===
Dysdera inhabits all of the Macaronesian archipelagos, but the most drastic variety is in the Canary Islands, a 22 million year old volcanic archipelago nearly 100 kilometres (62 mi) off the northwestern coast of Africa. These islands house over forty endemic species of Dysdera, thirty-six of which likely descended from a single ancestor, and six of which are associated with the oldest eastern island. On Lanzarote and Fuerteventura, the spider populations are limited to the highest elevation.

The most likely reason that these spiders are so abundant on the Canary Islands is due to the abundance of species on the nearby Iberian Peninsula and North Africas. Groups like Dysdera crocata and Dysdera erythrina, found on two neighboring lands, are found more often than D. lata and Dysdera longirostris, found also in North Africa and Iberia. Over time, these spiders either made their way to the islands or diversified when adapting to the different environments found in the islands.

In total, two to four colonization events are assumed. This probably happened by rafting, or even more likely by transport on floating islands, for Dysdera is not known to use ballooning. Dydera lancerotensis is the only species where an independent origin from continental ancestors is unquestionable; it was originally described as a subspecies of Dysdera crocata. While some of the remaining Macaronesian archipelagos have been colonized from the Canaries, the Azores have been independently colonized from the continent.

The radiation of Dysdera is surpassed on the Canary Islands only by the snail genus Napaeus, the millipede genus Dolichoiulus, and the beetle genera Attalus and Laparocerus.

== Species ==
As of October 2025 this genus contains 327 species and ten subspecies.

A study published in 2021 used an integrative approach combining morphological and molecular evidence to describe 8 species new to science as well as re-describing and synonymising some existing species.

These species have articles on Wikipedia:

- Dysdera aberrans Gasparo, 2010 – Italy
- Dysdera aculeata Kroneberg, 1875 – Central Asia. Introduced to Croatia
- Dysdera adriatica Kulczyński, 1897 – Austria, Balkans
- Dysdera affinis Ferrández, 1996 – Spain
- Dysdera alentejana Ferrández, 1996 – Portugal, Spain
- Dysdera ancora Grasshoff, 1959 – Italy
- Dysdera anonyma Ferrández, 1984 – Spain
- Dysdera apenninica Alicata, 1964 – Italy
- Dysdera arganoi Gasparo, 2004 – Italy
- Dysdera armenica Charitonov, 1956 – Armenia, Georgia, Azerbaijan
- Dysdera aurgitana Ferrández, 1996 – Spain
- Dysdera castillonensis Ferrández, 1996 – Spain
- Dysdera crocata C. L. Koch, 1838 – Azores, Europe, Northern Africa, Turkey, Caucasus, Iraq, Central Asia. Introduced to North America, Chile, Brazil, St. Helena, South Africa, Australia, New Zealand, Hawaii
- Dysdera erythrina (Walckenaer, 1802) – Southwestern and Western to Central Europe (type species)

Complete species list as of October 2025
- Dysdera aberrans Gasparo, 2010 – Italy
- Dysdera achaemenes Zamani, Marusik & Szűts, 2023 – Iran
- Dysdera aciculata Simon, 1882 – Algeria
- Dysdera aculeata Kroneberg, 1875 – Central Asia. Introduced to Croatia
- Dysdera adriatica Kulczyński, 1897 – Austria, Balkans
- Dysdera affinis Ferrández, 1996 – Spain
- Dysdera afghana Denis, 1958 – Afghanistan
- Dysdera agadirensis Lecigne, 2023 – Morocco
- Dysdera akpinarae Varol, 2016 – Turkey
- Dysdera alegranzaensis Wunderlich, 1992 – Canary Islands
- Dysdera alentejana Ferrández, 1996 – Portugal, Spain
- Dysdera algarvensis Wunderlich, 2023 – Portugal
- Dysdera algarvula Wunderlich, 2023 – Portugal
- Dysdera ambulotenta Ribera, Ferrández & Blasco, 1986 – Canary Islands
- Dysdera anatoliae Deeleman-Reinhold, 1988 – Turkey, Georgia
- Dysdera ancora Grasshoff, 1959 – Italy
- Dysdera andamanae Arnedo & Ribera, 1997 – Canary Islands
- Dysdera andreae Lecigne, 2025 – Morocco
- Dysdera andreini Caporiacco, 1928 – Italy, Albania
- Dysdera aneris Macías-Hernández & Arnedo, 2010 – Selvagens Is.
- Dysdera anonyma Ferrández, 1984 – Spain
- Dysdera apenninica Alicata, 1964 – Italy
  - D. a. aprutiana Alicata, 1964 – Italy
- Dysdera arabiafelix Gasparo & van Harten, 2006 – Yemen
- Dysdera arabica Deeleman-Reinhold, 1988 – Oman
- Dysdera arabisenen Arnedo & Ribera, 1997 – Canary Islands
- Dysdera argaeica Nosek, 1905 – Turkey
- Dysdera arganoi Gasparo, 2004 – Italy
- Dysdera armenica Charitonov, 1956 – Armenia, Georgia, Azerbaijan
- Dysdera arnedoi Lissner, 2017 – Spain (Majorca)
- Dysdera arnoldii Charitonov, 1956 – Tajikistan, Kyrgyzstan
- Dysdera asiatica Nosek, 1905 – Turkey
- Dysdera atabekia Zamani & Marusik, 2024 – Azerbaijan
- Dysdera atlantea Denis, 1954 – Morocco
- Dysdera atlantica Simon, 1909 – Morocco
- Dysdera aurgitana Ferrández, 1996 – Spain
- Dysdera azerbajdzhanica Charitonov, 1956 – Caucasus (Russia, Georgia, Azerbaijan)
- Dysdera baetica Ferrández, 1984 – Spain
- Dysdera bakhanovi Fomichev, 2023 – Georgia
- Dysdera bakhtiari Zamani, Marusik & Szűts, 2023 – Iran
- Dysdera balearica Thorell, 1873 – Spain (Majorca)
- Dysdera bandamae Schmidt, 1973 – Canary Islands
- Dysdera baratellii Pesarini, 2001 – Italy
- Dysdera bartang Fomichev, 2024 – Tajikistan
- Dysdera beieri Deeleman-Reinhold, 1988 – Greece
- Dysdera bellimundi Deeleman-Reinhold, 1988 – Montenegro, Albania
- Dysdera bernardi Denis, 1966 – Libya
- Dysdera bicolor Taczanowski, 1874 – French Guiana
- Dysdera bicornis Fage, 1931 – Spain
- Dysdera bidentata Dunin, 1990 – Azerbaijan
- Dysdera bogatschevi Dunin, 1990 – Georgia, Azerbaijan
- Dysdera borealicaucasica Dunin, 1991 – Russia (Caucasus)
- Dysdera bottazziae Caporiacco, 1951 – Italy, Croatia, Bosnia and Herzegovina
- Dysdera breviseta Wunderlich, 1992 – Canary Islands
- Dysdera brevispina Wunderlich, 1992 – Canary Islands
- Dysdera brignoliana Gasparo, 2000 – Italy
- Dysdera brignolii Dunin, 1989 – Turkmenistan
- Dysdera caeca Ribera, 1993 – Morocco
- Dysdera calderensis Wunderlich, 1987 – Canary Islands
- Dysdera caspica Dunin, 1990 – Caucasus (Russia, Azerbaijan)
- Dysdera castillonensis Ferrández, 1996 – Spain
- Dysdera catalonica Řezáč, 2018 – Spain, France
- Dysdera cechica Řezáč, 2018 – Austria, Czech Republic, Slovakia, Hungary, Serbia?
- Dysdera centroitalica Gasparo, 1997 – Italy
- Dysdera cephalonica Deeleman-Reinhold, 1988 – Greece
- Dysdera cetophonorum Crespo & Arnedo, 2021 – Azores
- Dysdera charitonowi Mcheidze, 1979 – Georgia
- Dysdera chioensis Wunderlich, 1992 – Canary Islands
- Dysdera circularis Deeleman-Reinhold, 1988 – Greece
- Dysdera citauca Crespo & Arnedo, 2021 – Madeira
- Dysdera coiffaiti Denis, 1962 – Madeira
- Dysdera collucata Dunin, 1991 – Armenia
- Dysdera concinna L. Koch, 1878 – Azerbaijan, Iran
- Dysdera corallina Risso, 1826 – Spain, France
- Dysdera corfuensis Deeleman-Reinhold, 1988 – Albania, Greece (Corfu)
- Dysdera cornipes Karsch, 1881 – Tunisia, Libya
- Dysdera cribellata Simon, 1883 – Canary Islands
- Dysdera cribrata Simon, 1882 – France, Italy, Andorra
- Dysdera cristata Deeleman-Reinhold, 1988 – Syria, Lebanon
- Dysdera crocata C. L. Koch, 1838 – Azores, Europe, Northern Africa, Turkey, Caucasus, Iraq, Central Asia. Introduced to North America, Chile, Brazil, St. Helena, South Africa, Australia, New Zealand, Hawaii
  - D. c. mutica Simon, 1911 – Algeria
  - D. c. parvula Simon, 1911 – Algeria
- Dysdera crocolita Simon, 1911 – Algeria
- Dysdera curviseta Wunderlich, 1987 – Canary Islands
- Dysdera cylindrica O. Pickard-Cambridge, 1885 – Pakistan
- Dysdera daghestanica Dunin, 1991 – Russia (Caucasus)
- Dysdera damavandica Zamani, Marusik & Szűts, 2023 – Iran
- Dysdera dentichelis Simon, 1882 – Lebanon
- Dysdera deserticola Simon, 1911 – Algeria
- Dysdera dissimilis Crespo & Arnedo, 2021 – Madeira
- Dysdera diversa Blackwall, 1862 – Madeira
- Dysdera dolanskyi Řezáč, 2018 – Spain
- Dysdera drescoi Ribera, 1983 – Morocco
- Dysdera dubrovninnii Deeleman-Reinhold, 1988 – Slovakia, Croatia to Albania, Romania, Ukraine
- Dysdera dunini Deeleman-Reinhold, 1988 – Turkey, Ukraine, Caucasus (Russia, Georgia, Azerbaijan?)
- Dysdera dushengi Lin, Chang & Li, 2020 – Kazakhstan, China
- Dysdera dysderoides (Caporiacco, 1947) – Ethiopia
- Dysdera edumifera Ferrández, 1983 – Spain
- Dysdera elamana Zamani & Marusik, 2023 – Iran
- Dysdera elburzica (Zamani, Marusik & Szűts, 2023) – Iran
- Dysdera enghoffi Arnedo, Oromí & Ribera, 1997 – Canary Islands
- Dysdera enguriensis Deeleman-Reinhold, 1988 – Bulgaria, Turkey
- Dysdera erythrina (Walckenaer, 1802) – Southwestern and Western to Central Europe (type species)
- Dysdera espanoli Ribera & Ferrández, 1986 – Spain
- Dysdera esquiveli Ribera & Blasco, 1986 – Canary Islands
- Dysdera exigua Crespo & Cardoso, 2021 – Madeira
- Dysdera fabrorum Řezáč, 2018 – Spain
- Dysdera falciformis Barrientos & Ferrández, 1982 – Spain
- Dysdera fedtschenkoi Dunin, 1992 – Tajikistan
- Dysdera ferghanica Dunin, 1985 – Kyrgyzstan
- Dysdera ferrandezi Barrientos & Hernández-Corral, 2022 – Spain
- Dysdera fervida Simon, 1882 – France (Corsica), Spain, (Balearic Is.)
- Dysdera festai Caporiacco, 1929 – Greece (Rhodes), Turkey
- Dysdera flagellata Grasshoff, 1959 – Italy
- Dysdera flagellifera Caporiacco, 1948 – Italy
  - D. f. aeoliensis Alicata, 1973 – Italy
- Dysdera flavitarsis Simon, 1882 – Portugal, Spain
- Dysdera fragaria Deeleman-Reinhold, 1988 – Greece (Rhodes), Turkey
- Dysdera furcata Varol & Danışman, 2018 – Turkey
- Dysdera fuscipes Simon, 1882 – Portugal, Spain, France
- Dysdera fustigans Alicata, 1966 – Italy
- Dysdera galinae Dimitrov, 2018 – Turkey
- Dysdera gamarrae Ferrández, 1984 – Spain
- Dysdera garrafensis Řezáč, 2018 – Spain
- Dysdera gemina Deeleman-Reinhold, 1988 – Israel
- Dysdera genoensis Zamani, Marusik & Szűts, 2023 – Iran
- Dysdera ghilarovi Dunin, 1987 – Azerbaijan
- Dysdera gibbifera Wunderlich, 1992 – Canary Islands
- Dysdera gigas Roewer, 1928 – Greece (Crete), Cyprus
- Dysdera gmelini Dunin, 1991 – Georgia
- Dysdera gollumi Ribera & Arnedo, 1994 – Canary Islands
- Dysdera gomerensis Strand, 1911 – Canary Islands
- Dysdera goyzha Zamani & Marusik, 2024 – Iraq
- Dysdera graia Řezáč, 2018 – France
- Dysdera granulata Kulczyński, 1897 – Italy, Balkans, Albania
- Dysdera gruberi Deeleman-Reinhold, 1988 – Turkey
- Dysdera guayota Arnedo & Ribera, 1999 – Canary Islands
- Dysdera guennouni Lecigne, Szűts & Moutaouakil, 2025 – Morocco
- Dysdera halkidikii Deeleman-Reinhold, 1988 – North Macedonia, Greece
- Dysdera hamifera Simon, 1911 – Algeria
  - D. h. macellina Simon, 1911 – Algeria
- Dysdera hattusas Deeleman-Reinhold, 1988 – Turkey
- Dysdera haykana Kosyan, Zamani & Marusik, 2023 – Armenia
- Dysdera helenae Ferrández, 1996 – Spain
- Dysdera hernandezi Arnedo & Ribera, 1999 – Canary Islands
- Dysdera hiemalis Deeleman-Reinhold, 1988 – Greece (Crete)
- Dysdera hirguan Arnedo, Oromí & Ribera, 1997 – Canary Islands
- Dysdera hirsti Denis, 1945 – Algeria
- Dysdera hormuzensis Zamani, Marusik & Szűts, 2023 – Iran
- Dysdera hungarica Kulczyński, 1897 – Slovenia, Slovakia, Serbia, Romania, Bulgaria, Moldova, Ukraine, Caucasus (Russia, Georgia, Azerbaijan)
  - D. h. atra Mcheidze, 1979 – Georgia, Azerbaijan
  - D. h. subalpina Dunin, 1992 – Russia (Caucasus)
- Dysdera iguanensis Wunderlich, 1987 – Canary Islands
- Dysdera imeretiensis Mcheidze, 1979 – Georgia
- Dysdera incertissima Denis, 1961 – Morocco
- Dysdera incognita Dunin, 1991 – Russia (Europe, Caucasus)
- Dysdera inermis Ferrández, 1984 – Spain
- Dysdera inopinata Dunin, 1991 – Georgia
- Dysdera insulana Simon, 1883 – Canary Islands
- Dysdera iranica Zamani, Marusik & Szűts, 2023 – Iran
- Dysdera isambertoi Crespo & Cardoso, 2021 – Madeira
- Dysdera isfahanica Zamani, Marusik & Szűts, 2023 – Iran
- Dysdera jaegeri Bellvert & Dimitrov, 2024 – Turkey, Syria
- Dysdera jana Gasparo & Arnedo, 2009 – Italy (Sardinia)
- Dysdera karabachica Dunin, 1990 – Azerbaijan
- Dysdera kati Komnenov & Chatzaki, 2016 – Greece
- Dysdera kollari Doblika, 1853 – Italy, Malta, Balkans, Greece, Turkey
- Dysdera kourosh Bellvert, Zamani & Dimitrov, 2024 – Iran
- Dysdera krisis Komnenov & Chatzaki, 2016 – Greece, Turkey
- Dysdera kronebergi Dunin, 1992 – Tajikistan
- Dysdera kropfi Řezáč, 2018 – Switzerland
- Dysdera kugitangica Dunin, 1992 – Turkmenistan
- Dysdera kulczynskii Simon, 1914 – France, Italy
- Dysdera kurdistanica Zamani & Marusik, 2024 – Iraq
- Dysdera kusnetsovi Dunin, 1989 – Turkmenistan
- Dysdera labradaensis Wunderlich, 1992 – Canary Islands
- Dysdera lagrecai Alicata, 1964 – Italy (Sicily), Malta
- Dysdera lancerotensis Simon, 1907 – Canary Islands
- Dysdera lantosquensis Simon, 1882 – France (incl. Corsica), Italy
- Dysdera lata Reuss, 1834 – Mediterranean to Georgia
- Dysdera laterispina Pesarini, 2001 – Greece
- Dysdera leprieuri Simon, 1882 – Algeria
- Dysdera levipes Wunderlich, 1987 – Canary Islands
- Dysdera ligustica Gasparo, 1997 – Italy
- Dysdera limitanea Dunin, 1985 – Turkmenistan
- Dysdera limnos Deeleman-Reinhold, 1988 – Greece
- Dysdera liostethus Simon, 1907 – Canary Islands
- Dysdera littoralis Denis, 1962 – Morocco
- Dysdera longa Wunderlich, 1992 – Canary Islands
- Dysdera longimandibularis Nosek, 1905 – Turkey, Cyprus
- Dysdera longirostris Doblika, 1853 – Central to south-eastern and eastern Europe, Turkey, Caucasus
- Dysdera lubrica Simon, 1907 – Egypt
- Dysdera lucidipes Simon, 1882 – Algeria
  - D. l. melillensis Simon, 1911 – Morocco
- Dysdera lusitanica Kulczyński, 1915 – Portugal, Spain
- Dysdera machadoi Ferrández, 1996 – Portugal, Spain
- Dysdera macra Simon, 1883 – Canary Islands
- Dysdera madai Arnedo, 2007 – Canary Islands
- Dysdera mahan Macías-Hernández & Arnedo, 2010 – Canary Islands
- Dysdera mariae Lecigne, 2025 – Morocco
- Dysdera maronita Gasparo, 2003 – Lebanon
- Dysdera martensi Dunin, 1991 – Caucasus (Russia, Georgia)
- Dysdera mauritanica Simon, 1909 – Morocco
  - D. m. aurantiaca Simon, 1909 – Morocco
- Dysdera maurusia Thorell, 1873 – Algeria, Tunisia
- Dysdera mazeruni Zamani, Marusik & Szűts, 2023 – Iran
- Dysdera mazini Dunin, 1991 – Armenia, Azerbaijan
- Dysdera medes Zamani, Marusik & Szűts, 2023 – Iran
- Dysdera mehmeti Coşar, Yağmur, Danışman, Özkütük & Kunt, 2024 – Turkey
- Dysdera meschetiensis Mcheidze, 1979 – Georgia
- Dysdera metingurui Danışman, Coşar & Kunt, 2025 – Turkey
- Dysdera microdonta Gasparo, 2014 – Italy, Austria, Slovenia, Serbia
- Dysdera mikhailovi Fomichev & Marusik, 2021 – Tajikistan
- Dysdera minairo Řezáč, 2018 – Spain
- Dysdera minuta Deeleman-Reinhold, 1988 – Greece (Rhodes)
- Dysdera minutissima Wunderlich, 1992 – Canary Islands
- Dysdera mixta Deeleman-Reinhold, 1988 – Turkey
- Dysdera montanetensis Wunderlich, 1992 – Canary Islands
- Dysdera monterossoi Alicata, 1964 – Italy
- Dysdera moravica Řezáč, 2014 – Germany to Romania
- Dysdera mucronata Simon, 1911 – Morocco, Spain
- Dysdera murphyorum Deeleman-Reinhold, 1988 – Albania, Greece (Corfu)
- Dysdera nakhchivanica Beydizade, Shafaie & Guseinov, 2018 – Armenia, Azerbaijan
- Dysdera naouelae Bellvert & Dimitrov, 2024 – Central Asia ("Turkestan")
- Dysdera nenilini Dunin, 1989 – Kazakhstan, Turkmenistan
- Dysdera neocretica Deeleman-Reinhold, 1988 – Greece (Crete), Turkey
- Dysdera nesiotes Simon, 1907 – Selvagens Is. Canary Islands
- Dysdera nicaeensis Thorell, 1873 – France, Italy
- Dysdera ninnii Canestrini, 1868 – Switzerland, Italy, Slovenia, Croatia
- Dysdera nomada Simon, 1911 – Tunisia
- Dysdera nubila Simon, 1882 – France (Corsica), Italy
- Dysdera orahan Arnedo, Oromí & Ribera, 1997 – Canary Islands
- Dysdera ortunoi Ferrández, 1996 – Spain
- Dysdera osellai Alicata, 1973 – Italy, Bulgaria
- Dysdera paganettii Deeleman-Reinhold, 1988 – Italy
- Dysdera pamirica Dunin, 1992 – Tajikistan
- Dysdera pandazisi Hadjissarantos, 1940 – Albania, Greece
- Dysdera parthenogenetica Řezáč, 2025 – Austria, Czech Republic, Slovakia, Hungary
- Dysdera paucispinosa Wunderlich, 1992 – Canary Islands
- Dysdera pavani Caporiacco, 1941 – Italy
- Dysdera pectinata Deeleman-Reinhold, 1988 – Bulgaria, North Macedonia, Greece
- Dysdera persica Zamani, Marusik & Szűts, 2023 – Iran
- Dysdera pharaonis Simon, 1907 – Egypt
- Dysdera pococki Dunin, 1985 – Iran, Turkmenistan
- Dysdera pominii Caporiacco, 1948 – Italy
- Dysdera portisancti Wunderlich, 1995 – Madeira
- Dysdera portsensis Řezáč, 2018 – Spain
- Dysdera pradesensis Řezáč, 2018 – Spain
- Dysdera praepostera Denis, 1961 – Morocco
- Dysdera precaria Crespo, 2021 – Madeira
- Dysdera presai Ferrández, 1984 – Spain
- Dysdera pretneri Deeleman-Reinhold, 1988 – Croatia, Bosnia and Herzegovina, Montenegro, Greece
- Dysdera pristiphora Pesarini, 2001 – Italy
- Dysdera punctata C. L. Koch, 1838 – Southern Europe, Slovakia? Georgia?
- Dysdera punctocretica Deeleman-Reinhold, 1988 – Greece (Corfu)
- Dysdera pyrenaica Řezáč, 2018 – Spain
- Dysdera quindecima Řezáč, 2018 – Spain
- Dysdera raddei Dunin, 1990 – Azerbaijan
- Dysdera ramblae Arnedo, Oromí & Ribera, 1997 – Canary Islands
- Dysdera ratonensis Wunderlich, 1992 – Canary Islands
- Dysdera ravida Simon, 1909 – Morocco
- Dysdera recondita Crespo & Arnedo, 2021 – Madeira
- Dysdera richteri Charitonov, 1956 – Azerbaijan, Armenia, Georgia
- Dysdera roemeri Strand, 1906 – Ethiopia
- Dysdera romana Gasparo & Di Franco, 2008 – Italy
- Dysdera romantica Deeleman-Reinhold, 1988 – Greece
- Dysdera rostrata Denis, 1961 – Morocco
- Dysdera rubus Deeleman-Reinhold, 1988 – Greece, Turkey
- Dysdera rudis Simon, 1882 – France
- Dysdera rugichelis Simon, 1907 – Canary Islands
- Dysdera rullii Pesarini, 2001 – Italy
- Dysdera sagartia Zamani, Marusik & Szűts, 2023 – Iran
- Dysdera sanborondon Arnedo, Oromí & Ribera, 2000 – Canary Islands
- Dysdera sancticedri (Brignoli, 1978) – Lebanon
- Dysdera sandrae Crespo, 2021 – Madeira
- Dysdera satunini Dunin, 1990 – Azerbaijan
- Dysdera scabricula Simon, 1882 – France, Spain
- Dysdera sciakyi Pesarini, 2001 – Greece
- Dysdera seclusa Denis, 1961 – Morocco
- Dysdera sefrensis Simon, 1911 – Algeria
- Dysdera septima Řezáč, 2018 – Spain
- Dysdera shardana Opatova & Arnedo, 2009 – Italy (Sardinia)
- Dysdera sibyllina Arnedo, 2007 – Canary Islands
- Dysdera sibyllinica Kritscher, 1956 – Italy
- Dysdera silana Alicata, 1965 – Italy
- Dysdera silvatica Schmidt, 1981 – Canary Islands
- Dysdera simbeque Macías-Hernández & Arnedo, 2010 – Canary Islands
- Dysdera simoni Deeleman-Reinhold, 1988 – Syria, Israel, Lebanon
- Dysdera snassenica Simon, 1911 – Morocco
  - D. s. collina Simon, 1911 – Morocco
- Dysdera soleata Karsch, 1881 – Libya
- Dysdera solers Walckenaer, 1837 – Colombia
- Dysdera spasskyi Charitonov, 1956 – Georgia
- Dysdera spinicrus Simon, 1882 – Balkans, Greece, Syria
- Dysdera spinidorsum Wunderlich, 1992 – Canary Islands
- Dysdera stahlavskyi Řezáč, 2018 – France
- Dysdera subcylindrica Charitonov, 1956 – Kazakhstan, Tajikistan, Kyrgyzstan
- Dysdera subnubila Simon, 1907 – Italy, Tunisia, Egypt
- Dysdera subsquarrosa Simon, 1914 – France, Italy
- Dysdera sultani Deeleman-Reinhold, 1988 – Greece, Turkey
- Dysdera sutoria Denis, 1945 – Morocco
- Dysdera tapuria Zamani, Marusik & Szűts, 2023 – Iran
- Dysdera tartarica Kroneberg, 1875 – Kazakhstan, Central Asia
- Dysdera tbilisiensis Mcheidze, 1979 – Georgia, Azerbaijan
- Dysdera teixeirai Crespo & Cardoso, 2021 – Madeira
- Dysdera tenuistylus Denis, 1961 – Morocco
- Dysdera tezcani Varol & Akpınar, 2016 – Turkey
- Dysdera tilosensis Wunderlich, 1992 – Canary Islands
- Dysdera titanica Crespo & Arnedo, 2021 – Madeira
- Dysdera topcui Gasparo, 2008 – Turkey
- Dysdera transcaspica Dunin & Fet, 1985 – Iran, Turkmenistan
- Dysdera tredecima Řezáč, 2018 – Spain
- Dysdera turanguveni Danışman, Coşar & Kunt, 2025 – Turkey
- Dysdera turcica Varol, 2016 – Turkey
- Dysdera tystshenkoi Dunin, 1989 – Turkmenistan
- Dysdera udata Kunt & Özkütük, 2024 – Cyprus
- Dysdera ukrainensis Charitonov, 1956 – Ukraine, Russia (Europe), Caucasus (Russia, Georgia)
- Dysdera undecima Řezáč, 2018 – Spain
- Dysdera unguimmanis Ribera, Ferrández & Blasco, 1986 – Canary Islands
- Dysdera valentina Ribera, 2004 – Spain
- Dysdera veigai Ferrández, 1984 – Spain
- Dysdera ventricosa Grasshoff, 1959 – Italy
- Dysdera verkana Zamani, Marusik & Szűts, 2023 – Iran
- Dysdera vermicularis Berland, 1936 – Cape Verde
- Dysdera verneaui Simon, 1883 – Canary Islands
- Dysdera vesiculifera Simon, 1882 – Algeria
- Dysdera vignai Gasparo, 2003 – Lebanon
- Dysdera vivesi Ribera & Ferrández, 1986 – Spain
- Dysdera volcania Ribera, Ferrández & Blasco, 1986 – Canary Islands
- Dysdera werneri Deeleman-Reinhold, 1988 – Greece
- Dysdera westringi O. Pickard-Cambridge, 1872 – Eastern Mediterranean, Iraq
- Dysdera xerxesi Zamani, Marusik & Szűts, 2023 – Iran
- Dysdera yguanirae Arnedo & Ribera, 1997 – Canary Islands
- Dysdera yigitakcai Coşar, Yağmur, Danışman, Özkütük & Kunt, 2024 – Turkey
- Dysdera yozgat Deeleman-Reinhold, 1988 – Turkey
- Dysdera zarudnyi Charitonov, 1956 – Central Asia, Afghanistan
- Dysdera zonsteini Dimitrov, 2021 – Turkmenistan
