= Dysdera aberrans =

Scientific classification
- Kingdom: Animalia
- Phylum: Arthropoda
- Subphylum: Chelicerata
- Class: Arachnida
- Order: Araneae
- Infraorder: Araneomorphae
- Family: Dysderidae
- Genus: Dysdera
- Species: D. aberrans

Binomial name
- Dysdera aberrans Gasparo, 2010

Species of spider

Dysdera aberrans is a spider species found in Italy.
