= Folkia =

Scientific classification
- Kingdom: Animalia
- Phylum: Arthropoda
- Subphylum: Chelicerata
- Class: Arachnida
- Order: Araneae
- Infraorder: Araneomorphae
- Family: Dysderidae
- Genus: Folkia; Kratochvíl, 1970

Type species
- F. inermis (Absolon & Kratochvíl, 1933)

Species
- 7, see text

Genus of spiders

Folkia is a genus of Balkan woodlouse hunting spiders that was first described by J. Kratochvíl in 1970 as subgenus of Stalagtia, and elevated to genus status in 1974. It is endemic to Balkans.

== Species ==
As of May 2019 it contains seven species:

- Folkia boudewijni Deeleman-Reinhold, 1993 – Croatia
- Folkia haasi (Reimoser, 1929) – Croatia
- Folkia inermis (Absolon & Kratochvíl, 1933) (type) – Croatia
- Folkia lugens Brignoli, 1974 – Greece
- Folkia mrazeki (Nosek, 1904) – Montenegro
- Folkia pauciaculeata (Fage, 1943) – Bosnia-Hercegovina
- Folkia subcupressa Deeleman-Reinhold, 1993 – Croatia
