= Dysdera apenninica =

Scientific classification
- Kingdom: Animalia
- Phylum: Arthropoda
- Subphylum: Chelicerata
- Class: Arachnida
- Order: Araneae
- Infraorder: Araneomorphae
- Family: Dysderidae
- Genus: Dysdera
- Species: D. apenninica

Binomial name
- Dysdera apenninica Alicata, 1964

Subspecies
- Dysdera apenninica aprutiana Alicata, 1964 — Italy

Species of spider

Dysdera apenninica is a spider species found in Italy.
