= Dysdera alentejana =

Scientific classification
- Kingdom: Animalia
- Phylum: Arthropoda
- Subphylum: Chelicerata
- Class: Arachnida
- Order: Araneae
- Infraorder: Araneomorphae
- Family: Dysderidae
- Genus: Dysdera
- Species: D. alentejana

Binomial name
- Dysdera alentejana Ferrandez, 1996

Species of spider

Dysdera alentejana is a spider species found in Portugal.
