= Dysdera armenica =

Scientific classification
- Kingdom: Animalia
- Phylum: Arthropoda
- Subphylum: Chelicerata
- Class: Arachnida
- Order: Araneae
- Infraorder: Araneomorphae
- Family: Dysderidae
- Genus: Dysdera
- Species: D. armenica

Binomial name
- Dysdera armenica Charitonov, 1956

Species of spider

Dysdera armenica is a spider species found in Armenia and Georgia.
