= Dysdera anonyma =

Scientific classification
- Kingdom: Animalia
- Phylum: Arthropoda
- Subphylum: Chelicerata
- Class: Arachnida
- Order: Araneae
- Infraorder: Araneomorphae
- Family: Dysderidae
- Genus: Dysdera
- Species: D. anonyma

Binomial name
- Dysdera anonyma Ferrandez, 1984

Species of spider

Dysdera anonyma is a spider species found in Spain.
