= Dysdera castillonensis =

Scientific classification
- Domain: Eukaryota
- Kingdom: Animalia
- Phylum: Arthropoda
- Subphylum: Chelicerata
- Class: Arachnida
- Order: Araneae
- Infraorder: Araneomorphae
- Family: Dysderidae
- Genus: Dysdera
- Species: D. castillonensis

Binomial name
- Dysdera castillonensis Ferrández, 1996

Species of spider

Dysdera castillonensis is a species of spider in the genus Dysdera, family Dysderidae. The species, endemic to Spain, was first described by Miguel Ferrández in 1996.

No subspecies are listed by the World Spider Catalog.
