= Dysdera andreini =

Scientific classification
- Kingdom: Animalia
- Phylum: Arthropoda
- Subphylum: Chelicerata
- Class: Arachnida
- Order: Araneae
- Infraorder: Araneomorphae
- Family: Dysderidae
- Genus: Dysdera
- Species: D. andreini

Binomial name
- Dysdera andreini Caporiacco, 1928

Species of spider

Dysdera andreini is a spider species found in Italy and Albania.
