= Folkia mrazeki =

Scientific classification
- Kingdom: Animalia
- Phylum: Arthropoda
- Subphylum: Chelicerata
- Class: Arachnida
- Order: Araneae
- Infraorder: Araneomorphae
- Family: Dysderidae
- Genus: Folkia
- Species: F. mrazeki

Binomial name
- Folkia mrazeki Nosek, 1904

Species of spider

Folkia mrazeki is a species of woodlouse spider found in Montenegro.

== Distribution ==
This species is endemic to Montenegro. Its precise range is obscure and poorly defined, but it is known from several isolated cave systems in the country's karst regions. The Lipa cave near Cetinje is a confirmed locality for example.
