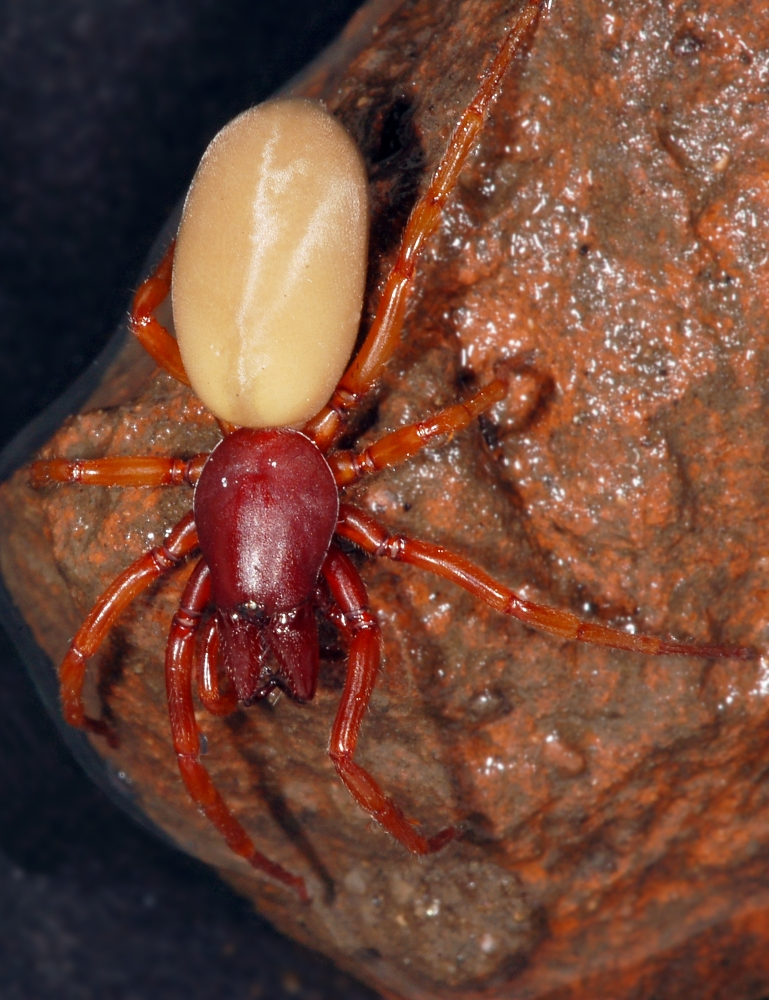

Scientific classification
- Domain: Eukaryota
- Kingdom: Animalia
- Phylum: Arthropoda
- Subphylum: Chelicerata
- Class: Arachnida
- Order: Araneae
- Infraorder: Araneomorphae
- Family: Dysderidae
- Genus: Dysdera
- Species: D. erythrina

Binomial name
- Dysdera erythrina (Walckenaer, 1802)

= Dysdera erythrina =

Species of spider

Dysdera erythrina is a species of spider in the family Dysderidae. It is nearly indistinguishable from the spider Dysdera crocata, but is far less common and has a much smaller geographic range. Like its relative D. crocata, this spider uses its disproportionately huge chelicerae to kill woodlice, as well as silverfish, earwigs, millipedes, beetles, and even centipedes.

== Distribution ==
The species is commonly found in the south of Great Britain. It is also found in Western and Central Europe.
