= Dysdera aculeata =

Scientific classification
- Kingdom: Animalia
- Phylum: Arthropoda
- Subphylum: Chelicerata
- Class: Arachnida
- Order: Araneae
- Infraorder: Araneomorphae
- Family: Dysderidae
- Genus: Dysdera
- Species: D. aculeata

Binomial name
- Dysdera aculeata Kroneberg, 1875

Species of spider

Dysdera aculeata is a spider species found from Central Asia. It has been introduced in Croatia.
