= Dekon =

Village in Kurdistan Region, Iraq

Dekon دێکۆن
- Location in Kurdistan Region, Iraq Dekon (Iraq)
- Coordinates: 35°16′38″N 46°2′6″E
- Country: Iraq
- Region: Kurdistan Region
- Governorate: Halabja
- District: Khurmal
- Time zone: AST (UTC+3)

Dekon (Kurdish: دێ کۆن, دێکۆن) is a village in the Halabja Governorate of Kurdistan Region, Iraq. It is part of the Khurmal District.
