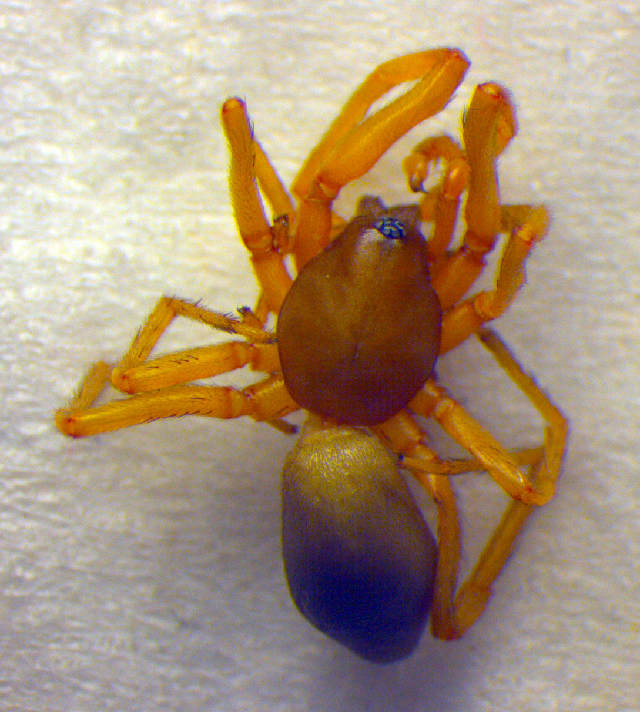

Scientific classification
- Kingdom: Animalia
- Phylum: Arthropoda
- Subphylum: Chelicerata
- Class: Arachnida
- Order: Araneae
- Infraorder: Araneomorphae
- Family: Dysderidae
- Genus: Harpactea
- Species: H. rubicunda

Binomial name
- Harpactea rubicunda (C. L. Koch, 1838)

= Harpactea rubicunda =

Species of spider

Harpactea rubicunda is a spider species found all over Europe but mostly in the continent's central region.It is absent in Southern Europe however present in the Balkans
