= Hygrocrates =

Scientific classification
- Kingdom: Animalia
- Phylum: Arthropoda
- Subphylum: Chelicerata
- Class: Arachnida
- Order: Araneae
- Infraorder: Araneomorphae
- Family: Dysderidae
- Genus: Hygrocrates; Deeleman-Reinhold, 1988

Type species
- H. lycaoniae (Brignoli, 1978)

Species
- 5, see text

Genus of spiders

Hygrocrates is a genus of woodlouse hunting spiders that was first described by Christa L. Deeleman-Reinhold & P. R. Deeleman in 1988.

== Species ==
As of May 2019 it contains five species:

- Hygrocrates caucasicus Dunin, 1992 – Georgia
- Hygrocrates deelemanus Kunt & Yağmur, 2011 – Turkey
- Hygrocrates georgicus (Mcheidze, 1972) – Georgia
- Hygrocrates kovblyuki Kunt & Marusik, 2013 – Turkey
- Hygrocrates lycaoniae (Brignoli, 1978) (type) – Greece (Rhodes), Turkey
