= Dysdera adriatica =

Scientific classification
- Kingdom: Animalia
- Phylum: Arthropoda
- Subphylum: Chelicerata
- Class: Arachnida
- Order: Araneae
- Infraorder: Araneomorphae
- Family: Dysderidae
- Genus: Dysdera
- Species: D. adriatica

Binomial name
- Dysdera adriatica Kulczyński, 1897

Synonyms
- Dysdera hungarica adriatica Kulczyński, 1897

Species of spider

Dysdera adriatica is a spider species found in Austria and the Balkans. It was first described by Władysław Kulczyński in 1897 as Dysdera hungarica var. adriatica. It was elevated to a full species in 1988.
