= Stalitochara =

Scientific classification
- Kingdom: Animalia
- Phylum: Arthropoda
- Subphylum: Chelicerata
- Class: Arachnida
- Order: Araneae
- Infraorder: Araneomorphae
- Family: Dysderidae
- Genus: Stalitochara; Simon, 1913
- Species: S. kabiliana

Binomial name
- Stalitochara kabiliana Simon, 1913

Genus of spiders

Stalitochara is a monotypic genus of North African woodlouse hunting spiders containing the single species, Stalitochara kabiliana. It was first described by Eugène Simon in 1913, and has only been found in Algeria.
