= Holissus =

Scientific classification
- Kingdom: Animalia
- Phylum: Arthropoda
- Subphylum: Chelicerata
- Class: Arachnida
- Order: Araneae
- Infraorder: Araneomorphae
- Family: Dysderidae
- Genus: Holissus; Simon, 1882
- Species: H. unciger

Binomial name
- Holissus unciger Simon, 1882

Genus of spiders

Holissus is a monotypic genus of Spanish woodlouse hunting spiders containing the single species, Holissus unciger. It was first described by Eugène Simon in 1882, and has only been found in France.
