= Kaemis =

Scientific classification
- Kingdom: Animalia
- Phylum: Arthropoda
- Subphylum: Chelicerata
- Class: Arachnida
- Order: Araneae
- Infraorder: Araneomorphae
- Family: Dysderidae
- Genus: Kaemis; Deeleman-Reinhold, 1993

Type species
- K. vernalis Deeleman-Reinhold, 1993

Species
- 5, see text

Genus of spiders

Kaemis is a genus of woodlouse hunting spiders that was first described by Christa L. Deeleman-Reinhold in 1993.

== Species ==
As of May 2019 it contains five species:

- Kaemis aeruginosus (Barrientos, Espuny & Ascaso, 1994) – Spain
- Kaemis carnicus Gasparo, 1995 – Italy
- Kaemis circe (Brignoli, 1975) – Italy
- Kaemis gasparoi Mazzoleni & Pantini, 2018 – Italy
- Kaemis vernalis Deeleman-Reinhold, 1993 (type) – Montenegro
