= Khurmal District =

Khurmal District ناحیەی خورماڵ
- District
- Country: Iraq
- Autonomous region: Kurdistan
- Governorate: Halabja Governorate
- Time zone: UTC+3 (AST)

Khurmal District (Sorani Kurdish: قەزای خورماڵ, romanized: Qezay Xurmal) is a district of the Halabja Governorate in Kurdistan Region, Iraq. Its capital is the city of Khurmal. It is entirely populated by Kurds.
