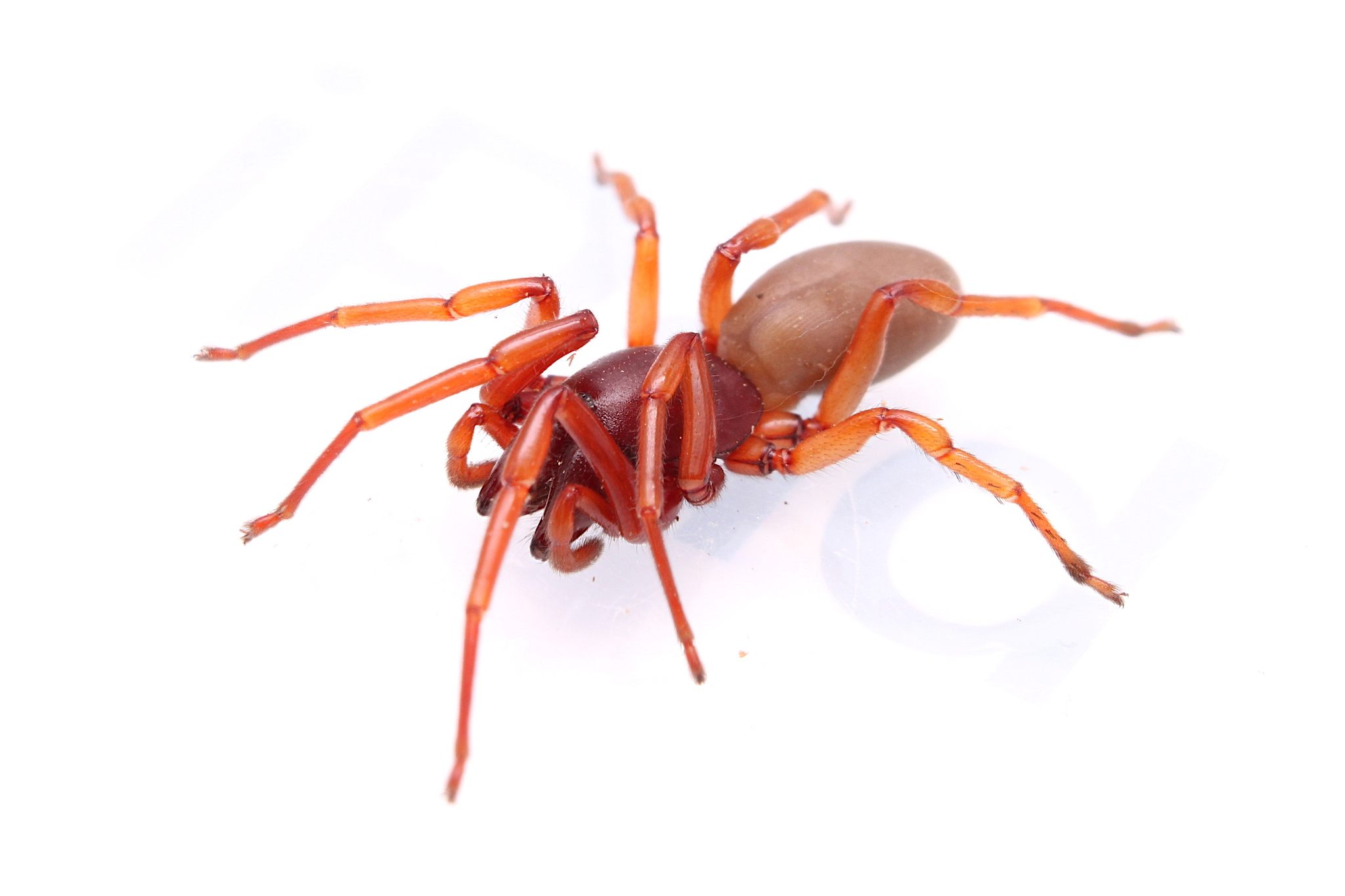
- female from Ohio
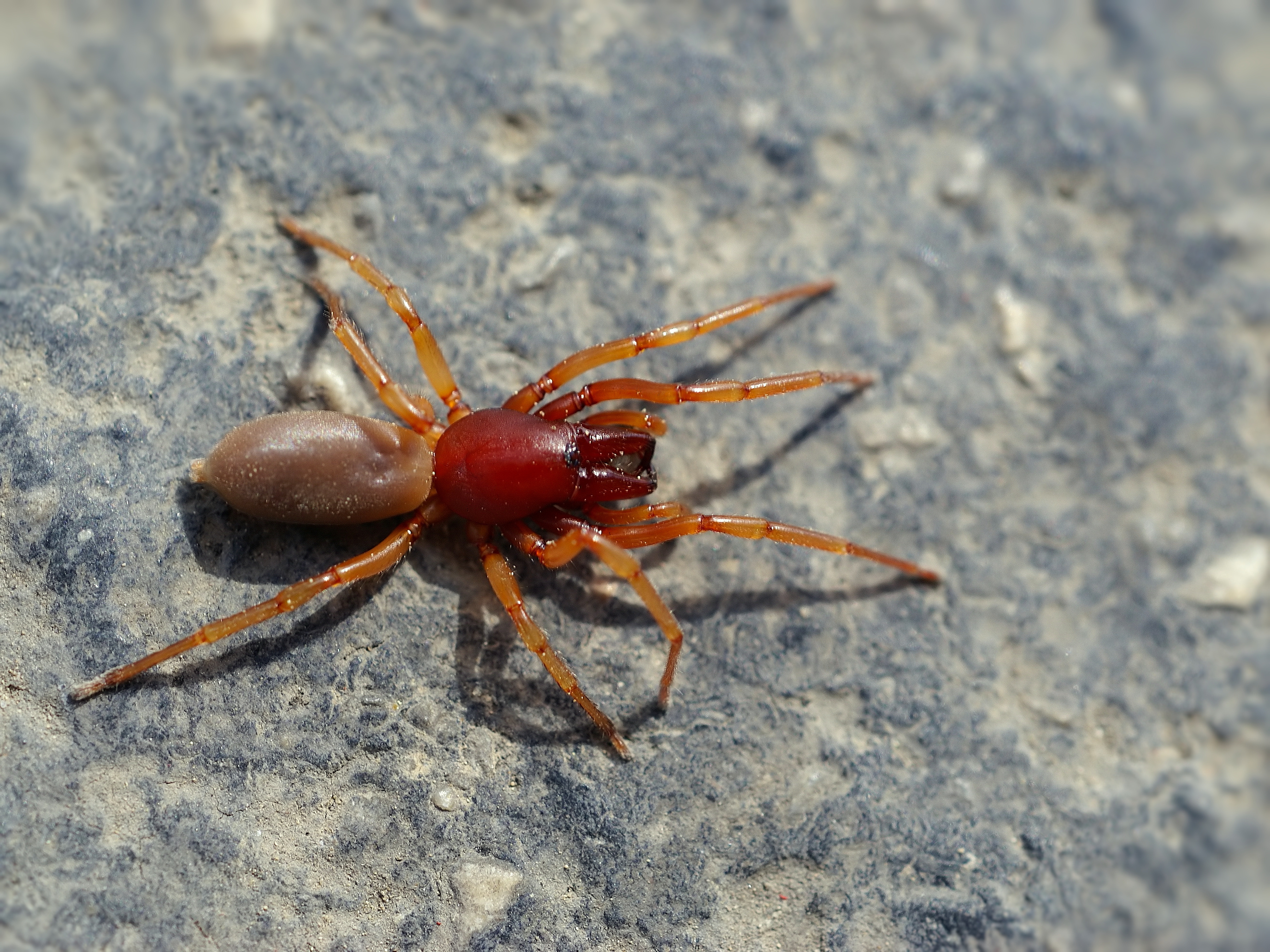
- male

Scientific classification
- Kingdom: Animalia
- Phylum: Arthropoda
- Subphylum: Chelicerata
- Class: Arachnida
- Order: Araneae
- Infraorder: Araneomorphae
- Family: Dysderidae
- Genus: Dysdera
- Species: D. crocata

Binomial name
- Dysdera crocata C. L. Koch, 1838
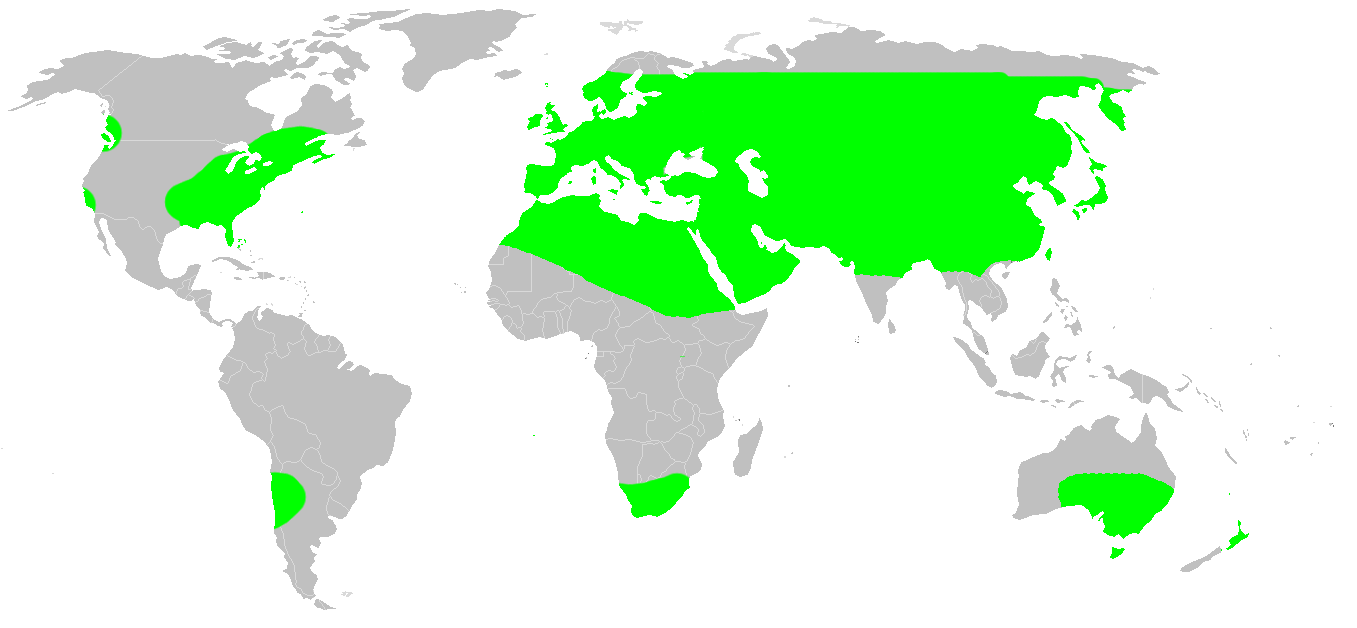

Synonyms
- D. interrita; D. gracilis; D. rubicunda; D. wollastoni; D. maurusia; D. balearica; D. coerulescens; D. crocata; D. australiensis; D. sternalis; D. cretica; D. menozzii; D. palmensis; D. inaequuscapillata

= Woodlouse spider =

Species of spider

The woodlouse spider (Dysdera crocata) is a species of spider that preys primarily upon woodlice. Other common names refer to variations on the common name of its prey, including woodlouse hunter, sowbug hunter, sowbug killer, pillbug hunter and slater spider.

== Appearance ==
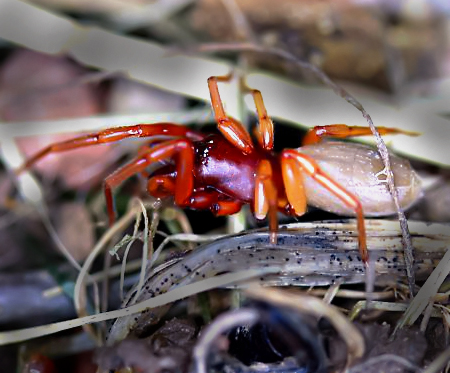
View from the side

Adult females have a body length of 11–15 mm (0.43–0.59 in), males 9–10 mm (0.35–0.39 in). They have six eyes, a tawny orange to dark-red cephalothorax and legs, and a shiny (sometimes very shiny) pale beige to yellow-brown abdomen, sometimes dark grey. Their chelicerae are disproportionately large for a spider of this size.

Dysdera crocata can be difficult to distinguish from the much less common Dysdera erythrina, though D. erythrina is not typically found near human dwellings.

== Distribution ==
Dysdera crocata, which originated in the Mediterranean area, now has a cosmopolitan distribution (see map), ranging from Eurasia to parts of North and South America, South Africa, Australia, and New Zealand. It is the only member of the Dysdera family known in North America.

== Behaviour ==
Woodlouse spiders are usually found under logs, rocks, bricks, plant pots and in leaf litter in warm places, often close to woodlice. They have also been found in houses. They spend the day in a silken retreat made to enclose crevices in, generally, partially decayed wood, but sometimes construct tent-like structures in indents of various large rocks. Woodlouse spiders hunt at night and do not spin webs. Rather than spinning their webs at night, they use this time to search warm places for prey.

Their diet consists principally of woodlice. They use their large chelicerae to get around the tough exoskeleton of the woodlouse and inject venom into its soft underbelly while avoiding any noxious defensive chemicals. Although the woodlouse spider is a dangerous predator to woodlice, it is not known to be a health hazard to humans or smaller animals.

Laboratory experiments have shown D. crocata will take other invertebrates, and shows no particular preference for woodlice; these are simply the most common prey in its habitat. Other invertebrates preyed on by D. crocata include silverfish, earwigs, millipedes, burying beetles and crickets. This small but relatively large-fanged spider is very well equipped to prey on underground invertebrates of almost any kind.

Because of its relatively large fangs and wide gape, the woodlouse spider is an unusually dominant predator for its size. Like many other Dysdera spiders, it frequently dominates, and sometimes kills, other spiders and centipedes.

The courtship of these spiders is typically aggressive and mates risk injury from each other's large chelicerae. The female lays her eggs in a silken sac and is believed to look after her young after hatching. These hiding places serve as a nest for the female's sac which can carry up to 70 eggs.

They have been known to bite humans if handled. Verified bites have caused no major medical problems. Localized itchiness at the bite site has been reported in some cases.
