= Dysderella =

Scientific classification
- Domain: Eukaryota
- Kingdom: Animalia
- Phylum: Arthropoda
- Subphylum: Chelicerata
- Class: Arachnida
- Order: Araneae
- Infraorder: Araneomorphae
- Family: Dysderidae
- Genus: Dysderella; Dunin, 1992

Type species
- D. transcaspica (Dunin & Fet, 1985)

Species
- D. caspica (Dunin, 1990) – Azerbaijan; D. transcaspica (Dunin & Fet, 1985) – Turkmenistan, Iran

Genus of spiders

Dysderella is a genus of Asian woodlouse hunting spiders that was first described by P. M. Dunin in 1992. As of May 2019 it contains only two species: D. caspica and D. transcaspica.
