= Parastalita =

Scientific classification
- Domain: Eukaryota
- Kingdom: Animalia
- Phylum: Arthropoda
- Subphylum: Chelicerata
- Class: Arachnida
- Order: Araneae
- Infraorder: Araneomorphae
- Family: Dysderidae
- Genus: Parastalita; Absolon & Kratochvíl, 1932
- Species: P. stygia

Binomial name
- Parastalita stygia (Joseph, 1882)

Genus of spiders

Parastalita is a monotypic genus of Balkan woodlouse hunting spiders containing the single species, Parastalita stygia. It was first described by K. Absolon & J. Kratochvíl in 1932, and has only been found in Bosnia and Herzegovina. Notably, this species is blind as it completely lacks eyes.
