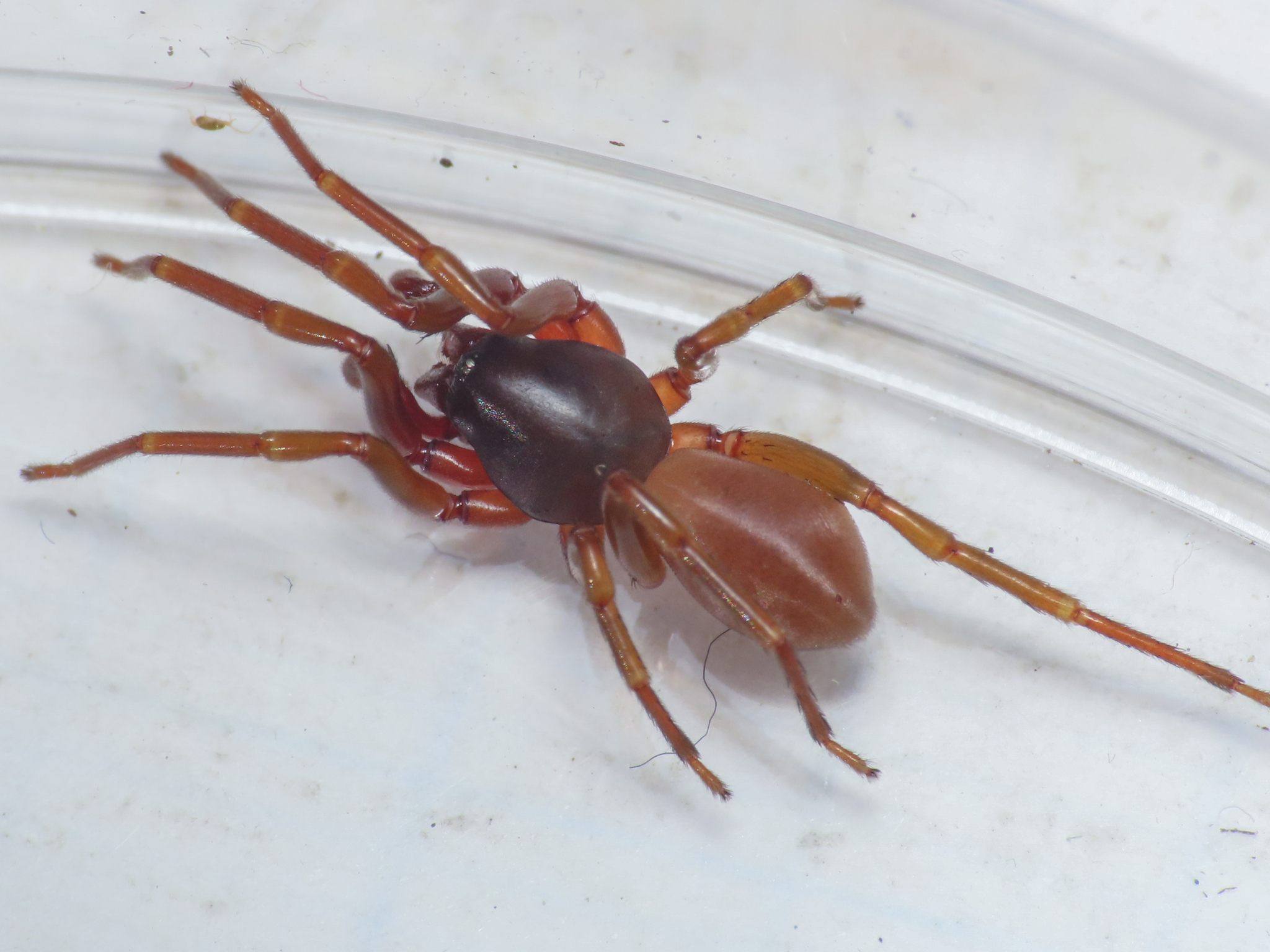
- Parachtes siculus

Scientific classification
- Kingdom: Animalia
- Phylum: Arthropoda
- Subphylum: Chelicerata
- Class: Arachnida
- Order: Araneae
- Infraorder: Araneomorphae
- Family: Dysderidae
- Genus: Parachtes; Alicata, 1964

Type species
- P. vernae (Caporiacco, 1936)

Species
- 13, see text

= Parachtes =

Genus of spiders

Parachtes is a genus of European woodlouse hunting spiders that was first described by P. Alicata in 1964.

== Species ==
As of May 2019 it contains thirteen species:

- Parachtes andreinii Alicata, 1966 – Italy
- Parachtes cantabrorum (Simon, 1914) – Spain, France
- Parachtes deminutus (Denis, 1957) – Spain
- Parachtes ignavus (Simon, 1882) – Spain, France (mainland, Corsica)
- Parachtes inaequipes (Simon, 1882) – France (Corsica)
- Parachtes latialis Alicata, 1966 – Italy
- Parachtes limbarae (Kraus, 1955) – Sardinia
- Parachtes loboi Jiménez-Valverde, Barriga & Moreno, 2006 – Spain
- Parachtes riberai Bosmans, 2017 – Spain (Majorca)
- Parachtes romandiolae (Caporiacco, 1949) – Italy
- Parachtes siculus (Caporiacco, 1949) – Italy
- Parachtes teruelis (Kraus, 1955) – Spain
- Parachtes vernae (Caporiacco, 1936) (type) – Italy
