= Tedia =

Scientific classification
- Kingdom: Animalia
- Phylum: Arthropoda
- Subphylum: Chelicerata
- Class: Arachnida
- Order: Araneae
- Infraorder: Araneomorphae
- Family: Dysderidae
- Genus: Tedia; Simon, 1882

Type species
- T. oxygnatha Simon, 1882

Species
- T. abdominalis Deeleman-Reinhold, 1988 – Israel, Syria; T. oxygnatha Simon, 1882 – Syria, Iran?

Genus of spiders

Tedia is a genus of Asian woodlouse hunting spiders that was first described by Eugène Simon in 1882. As of May 2019 it contains only two species: T. abdominalis and T. oxygnatha.
