= Speleoharpactea =

Scientific classification
- Kingdom: Animalia
- Phylum: Arthropoda
- Subphylum: Chelicerata
- Class: Arachnida
- Order: Araneae
- Infraorder: Araneomorphae
- Family: Dysderidae
- Genus: Speleoharpactea; Ribera, 1982
- Species: S. levantina

Binomial name
- Speleoharpactea levantina Ribera, 1982

Genus of spiders

Speleoharpactea is a monotypic genus of European woodlouse hunting spiders containing the single species, Speleoharpactea levantina. It was first described by C. Ribera in 1982, and has only been found in Spain.
