= Mesostalita =

Scientific classification
- Kingdom: Animalia
- Phylum: Arthropoda
- Subphylum: Chelicerata
- Class: Arachnida
- Order: Araneae
- Infraorder: Araneomorphae
- Family: Dysderidae
- Genus: Mesostalita; Deeleman-Reinhold, 1971

Type species
- M. kratochvili Deeleman-Reinhold, 1971

Species
- M. comottii (Gasparo, 1999) – Croatia; M. kratochvili Deeleman-Reinhold, 1971 – Bosnia-Hercegovina; M. nocturna (Roewer, 1931) – Italy, Slovenia

Genus of spiders

Mesostalita is a genus of woodlouse hunting spiders that was first described by Christa L. Deeleman-Reinhold in 1971. As of May 2019 it contains only three species: M. comottii, M. kratochvili, and M. nocturna.
