= Stalitella =

Scientific classification
- Domain: Eukaryota
- Kingdom: Animalia
- Phylum: Arthropoda
- Subphylum: Chelicerata
- Class: Arachnida
- Order: Araneae
- Infraorder: Araneomorphae
- Family: Dysderidae
- Genus: Stalitella; Absolon & Kratochvíl, 1932
- Species: S. noseki

Binomial name
- Stalitella noseki Absolon & Kratochvíl, 1933

Genus of spiders

Stalitella is a monotypic genus of Balkan woodlouse hunting spiders containing the single species, Stalitella noseki. It was first described by K. Absolon & J. Kratochvíl in 1932, and has only been found in Bosnia and Herzegovina and in Montenegro.
