= Dysderocrates =

Scientific classification
- Kingdom: Animalia
- Phylum: Arthropoda
- Subphylum: Chelicerata
- Class: Arachnida
- Order: Araneae
- Infraorder: Araneomorphae
- Family: Dysderidae
- Genus: Dysderocrates; Deeleman-Reinhold & Deeleman, 1988

Type species
- D. storkani (Kratochvíl, 1935)

Species
- 8, see text

Genus of spiders

Dysderocrates is a genus of woodlouse hunting spiders that was first described by Christa L. Deeleman-Reinhold & P. R. Deeleman in 1988.

== Species ==
As of May 2019 it contains eight species:

- Dysderocrates egregius (Kulczyński, 1897) – Hungary, Romania
- Dysderocrates gasparoi Deeleman-Reinhold, 1988 – Greece (Corfu)
- Dysderocrates kibrisensis Gücel, Charalambidou, Göçmen & Kunt, 2019 – Cyprus
- Dysderocrates marani (Kratochvíl, 1937) – Greece (Crete)
- Dysderocrates regina Deeleman-Reinhold, 1988 – Turkey
- Dysderocrates silvestris Deeleman-Reinhold, 1988 – Bosnia-Hercegovina, Montenegro
- Dysderocrates storkani (Kratochvíl, 1935) (type) – SE Europe (Balkans)
- Dysderocrates tanatmisi Karakaş Kiliç & Özkütük, 2017 – Turkey
