= Rhodera =

Scientific classification
- Domain: Eukaryota
- Kingdom: Animalia
- Phylum: Arthropoda
- Subphylum: Chelicerata
- Class: Arachnida
- Order: Araneae
- Infraorder: Araneomorphae
- Family: Dysderidae
- Genus: Rhodera; Deeleman-Reinhold, 1989
- Species: R. hypogea

Binomial name
- Rhodera hypogea Deeleman-Reinhold, 1989

Genus of spiders

Rhodera is a monotypic genus of Balkan woodlouse hunting spiders containing the single species, Rhodera hypogea. It was first described by Christa L. Deeleman-Reinhold in 1989, and has only been found on Crete.
