= Sardostalita =

Scientific classification
- Domain: Eukaryota
- Kingdom: Animalia
- Phylum: Arthropoda
- Subphylum: Chelicerata
- Class: Arachnida
- Order: Araneae
- Infraorder: Araneomorphae
- Family: Dysderidae
- Genus: Sardostalita; Gasparo, 1999
- Species: S. patrizii

Binomial name
- Sardostalita patrizii (Roewer, 1956)

Synonyms
- Stalita patrizii Gasparo, 1999; Kaemis patrizii Le Peru, 2011

Genus of spiders

Sardostalita is a monotypic genus of European woodlouse hunting spiders containing the single species, Sardostalita patrizii. It was first described by F. Gasparo, who moved the sole species to its own genus when a male was discovered in 1999. It has only been found on Sardinia.
