= Minotauria =

Scientific classification
- Kingdom: Animalia
- Phylum: Arthropoda
- Subphylum: Chelicerata
- Class: Arachnida
- Order: Araneae
- Infraorder: Araneomorphae
- Family: Dysderidae
- Genus: Minotauria; Kulczyński, 1903

Type species
- M. attemsi Kulczyński, 1903

Species
- M. attemsi Kulczyński, 1903 – Greece (Crete); M. fagei (Kratochvíl, 1970) – Greece (Crete)

Genus of spiders

Minotauria is a genus of Balkan woodlouse hunting spiders that was first described by Władysław Kulczyński in 1903. As of May 2019 it contains only two species: M. attemsi and M. fagei. In 1847, it was argued to be a synonym of Stalita.
