= Stalagtia =

Scientific classification
- Kingdom: Animalia
- Phylum: Arthropoda
- Subphylum: Chelicerata
- Class: Arachnida
- Order: Araneae
- Infraorder: Araneomorphae
- Family: Dysderidae
- Genus: Stalagtia; Kratochvíl, 1970

Type species
- S. hercegovinensis (Nosek, 1905)

Species
- 7, see text

Genus of spiders

Stalagtia is a genus of woodlouse hunting spiders that was first described by J. Kratochvíl in 1970.

== Species ==
As of May 2019 it contains seven species:

- Stalagtia argus Brignoli, 1976 – Greece
- Stalagtia christoi Van Keer & Bosmans, 2009 – Greece
- Stalagtia hercegovinensis (Nosek, 1905) (type) – SE Europe (Balkans), Turkey
- Stalagtia kratochvili Brignoli, 1976 – Greece
- Stalagtia monospina (Absolon & Kratochvíl, 1933) – Montenegro
- Stalagtia skadarensis Kratochvíl, 1970 – Montenegro
- Stalagtia thaleriana Chatzaki & Arnedo, 2006 – Greece (Crete), Turkey
