= Tamara Mkheidze =

Georgian arachnologist

Tamara Severyanovna Mkheidze
- Born: 22 December 1915; Kutaisi, Georgia
- Died: 11 April 2007 (aged 91); Tbilisi, Georgia
- Other names: Tamara Mcheidze
- Occupation: Arachnologist
- Years active: 1941–2006 (publications)
- Known for: Arachnology in Georgia and the Caucasus
- Spouse: Lavrosi Kutubidze

Tamara Mkheidze (Georgian: თამარ მხეიძე; December 22, 1915, Kutaisi – April 11, 2007, Tbilisi) was a Georgian arachnologist. Her name is also spelt Tamara Mcheidze, including in the World Spider Catalog.

== Life ==
Tamara Mkheidze grew up in Kutaisi (Georgia) and later studied zoology at the Tbilisi State University. She worked there as a lecturer until 1990 and was active after that as an arachnologist.

She was married to the limnologist Lavrosi Kutubidze.

== Activities ==
Tamara Mkheidze was the first arachnologist from the Caucasus region. Her main research dealt with the arachnofauna of her homeland Georgia. In her more than thirty publications she described more than forty new species of spiders and harvestmen. As of April 2026, the World Spider Catalog lists 37 names of spider taxa of which she is the author or co-author.

A species she initially described as Gnaphosa caucasica in 1997 had to have a replacement name as the name had already been used in 1982. It was given the name Gnaphosa mcheidzeae.

== Selected publications ==
- Mkheidze T. S. (1941). A study on spiders distributed in Georgia. - Proceeding of the Tbilisi State University, 21: 99-104. [in Georgian]
- Mkheidze, T. S. (1946). New spider species in Georgia. Bulletin of the Georgian State Museum Tbilisi, 13(A): 285-302.
- Mkheidze, Tamara (1997): Georgian Spiders — Systematics, Ecology, Zoogeographic Review. Tbilisi University Press. Tbilisi, 390 pp. [Georgian, Russian Abstract]
