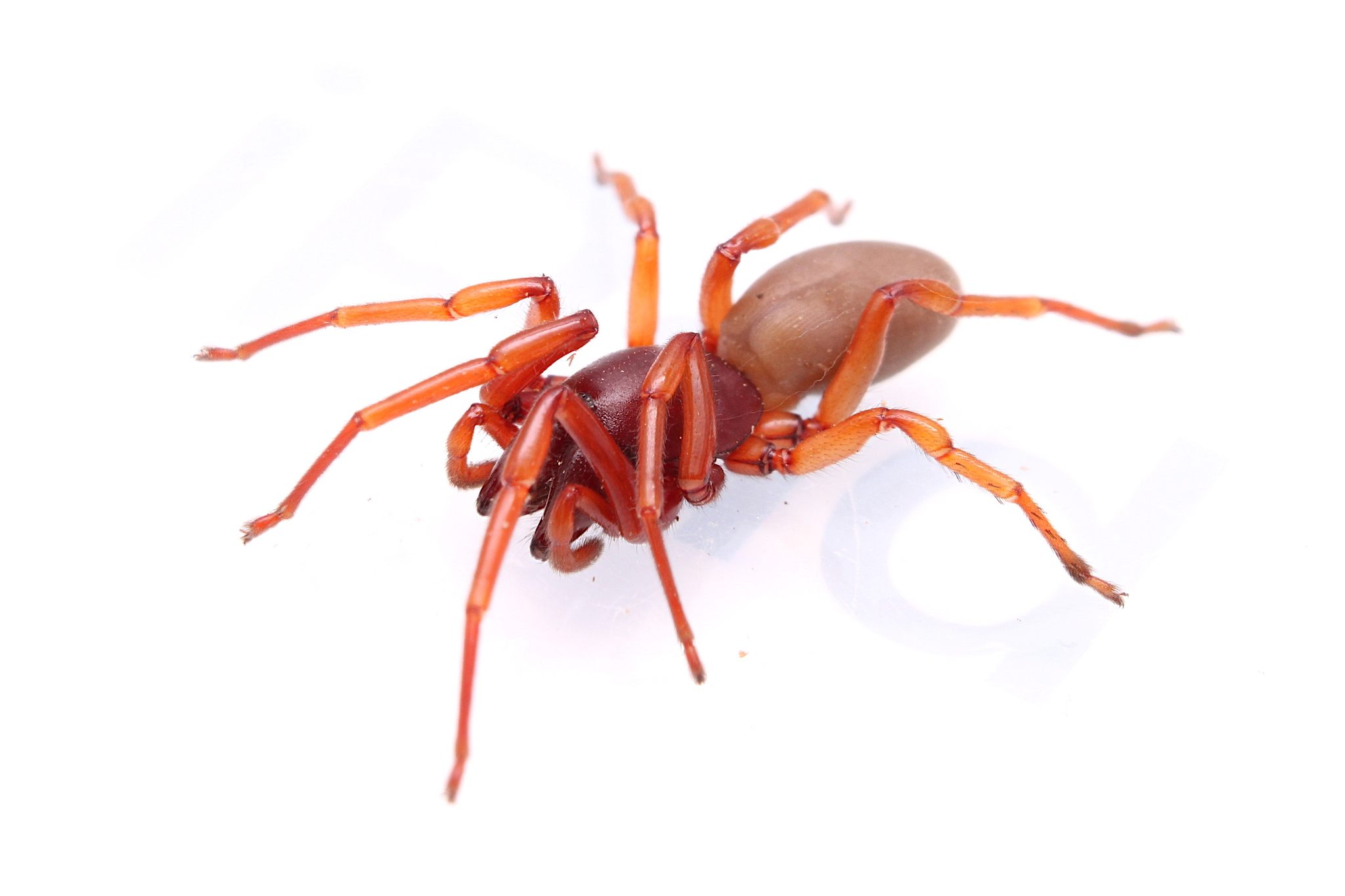
- female D. crocata
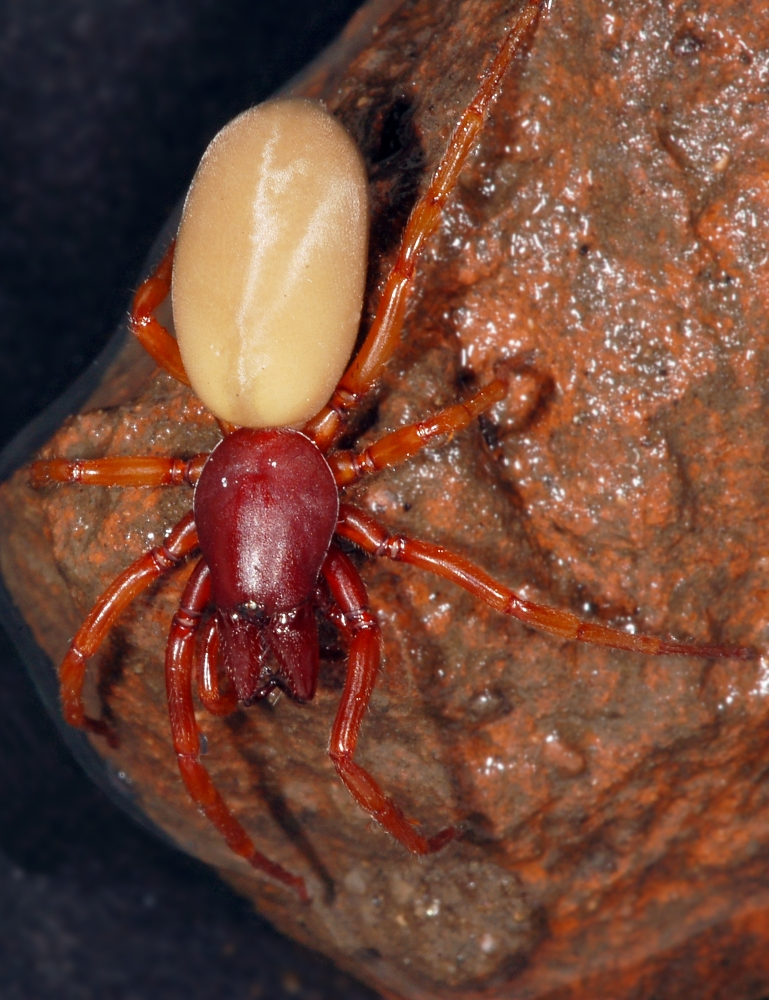
- female D. erythrina

Scientific classification
- Kingdom: Animalia
- Phylum: Arthropoda
- Subphylum: Chelicerata
- Class: Arachnida
- Order: Araneae
- Infraorder: Araneomorphae
- Family: Dysderidae; C. L. Koch, 1837

Diversity
- 24 genera, 665 species
- blue: reported countries (WSC) green: observation hotspots (iNaturalist)

= Dysderidae =

Dysderidae Temporal range: Palaeogene–present

Family of spiders

The Dysderidae, also known as woodlouse hunters, sowbug-eating spiders, and cell spiders, are a family of araneomorph spiders first described by Carl Ludwig Koch in 1837. They are found primarily in Eurasia, extending into North Africa with very few species occurring in South America. Dysdera crocata is introduced into many regions of the world.

Dysderids generally have six eyes, and are haplogyne, i.e. the females lack a sclerotized epigyne. There is a substantial number of genera, but two of them, Dysdera and Harpactea, account for a very large number of the species and are widespread across the family's range. One species, Dysdera crocata (the woodlouse hunter), has been transported over much of the planet together with its preferred foods—woodlice. Dysdera also feeds on beetles. These spiders have very large chelicerae. Their long fangs are specialized to reach under or slip between the armored plates of woodlice to deliver venom to their softer tissue. There are also some reports that they have a mildly toxic venom that can cause local reactions in humans.

The spiders have their six eyes arranged in a semicircle like segestrids, but have only the first two pairs of legs produced forward. Dysdera crocata has a characteristic coloring, which can only be confused with spiders in the trachelid genera Trachelas and Meriola: the carapace is dull red-brown and the abdomen gray or tan.

== Genera ==
The categorization into subfamilies follows Joel Hallan's Biology Catalog.

As of October 2025, this family includes 24 genera and 665 species:

- Dysderinae C. L. Koch, 1837
  - Cryptoparachtes Dunin, 1992 – Azerbaijan, Georgia
  - Dysdera Latreille, 1804 – Africa, Asia, Europe, Colombia, French Guiana. Introduced to South Africa, St. Helena, Croatia, Hawaii, Australia, New Zealand, Brazil, Chile
  - Dysderella Dunin, 1992 (Azerbaijan, Turkmenistan))
  - Dysderocrates Deeleman-Reinhold & Deeleman, 1988 – Turkey, Europe
  - Harpactocrates Simon, 1914 – Georgia, Italy, Spain, France
  - Hygrocrates Deeleman-Reinhold, 1988 – Georgia, Turkey, Greece
  - Kut Kunt, Elverici, Yağmur & Özkütük, 2019 – Turkey
  - Parachtes Alicata, 1964 – Italy, Spain, France
  - Rhodera Deeleman-Reinhold, 1989 – Crete
  - Stalitochara Simon, 1913 – Algeria
  - Tedia Simon, 1882 – Israel, Syria
- Harpacteinae
  - Dasumia Thorell, 1875 – Israel, Syria, Turkey, Europe, Balkans
  - Folkia Kratochvíl, 1970 – Southern Europe
  - Harpactea Bristowe, 1939 – Algeria, Tunisia, Asia, Europe to Ukraine
  - Holissus Simon, 1882 – Corsica
  - Kaemis Deeleman-Reinhold, 1993 – Southern Europe
  - Minotauria Kulczyński, 1903 – Crete
  - Sardostalita Gasparo, 1999 – Sardinia
  - Stalagtia Kratochvíl, 1970 – Turkey, Southern Europe
- Rhodinae
  - Mesostalita Deeleman-Reinhold, 1971 – Southern Europe
  - Parastalita Absolon & Kratochvíl, 1932 – Bosnia and Herzegovina
  - Rhode Simon, 1882 – Algeria, Morocco, Tunisia, Europe
  - Speleoharpactea Ribera, 1982 – Spain
  - Stalita Schiødte, 1847 – Croatia, Italy, Slovenia
  - Stalitella Absolon & Kratochvíl, 1933 – Bosnia and Herzegovina, Montenegro
- incertae sedis
  - Thereola Petrunkevitch, 1955 † (fossil, Oligocene)

  - Thereola petiolata (Koch & Berendt, 1854) †
