= List of Leptonetidae species =

This page lists all described species of the spider family Leptonetidae accepted by the World Spider Catalog as of February 2021:

== A ==
=== Appaleptoneta ===
Appaleptoneta Platnick, 1986

- A. barrowsi (Gertsch, 1974) — USA
- A. coma (Barrows, 1940) — USA
- A. credula (Gertsch, 1974) — USA
- A. fiskei (Gertsch, 1974) — USA
- A. gertschi (Barrows, 1940) — USA
- A. jonesi (Gertsch, 1974) — USA
- A. silvicultrix (Crosby & Bishop, 1925) (type) — USA

== B ==
=== Barusia ===
Barusia Kratochvíl, 1978

- B. hofferi (Kratochvíl, 1935) — Montenegro
- B. insulana (Kratochvíl & Miller, 1939) — Croatia
- B. korculana (Kratochvíl & Miller, 1939) — Croatia
- B. laconica (Brignoli, 1974) — Greece
- B. maheni (Kratochvíl & Miller, 1939) (type) — Croatia

== C ==
=== Calileptoneta ===
Calileptoneta Platnick, 1986

- C. briggsi Ledford, 2004 — USA
- C. californica (Banks, 1904) — USA
- C. cokendolpheri Ledford, 2004 — USA
- C. helferi (Gertsch, 1974) — USA
- C. noyoana (Gertsch, 1974) — USA
- C. oasa (Gertsch, 1974) (type) — USA
- C. sylva (Chamberlin & Ivie, 1942) — USA
- C. ubicki Ledford, 2004 — USA
- C. wapiti (Gertsch, 1974) — USA

=== Cataleptoneta ===
Cataleptoneta Denis, 1955

- C. aesculapii (Brignoli, 1968) — Turkey
- C. aydintopcui Demircan, 2020 — Turkey
- C. detriticola Deltshev & Li, 2013 — Bulgaria, Greece
- C. edentula Denis, 1955 (type) — Lebanon, Israel
- C. lingulata Wang & Li, 2010 — Croatia
- C. sbordonii (Brignoli, 1968) — Turkey
- C. semipinnata Wang & Li, 2010 — Greece
- C. sengleti (Brignoli, 1974) — Greece (Crete)

=== Chisoneta ===
Chisoneta Ledford & Griswold, 2011

- C. chisosea (Gertsch, 1974) — USA
- C. isolata (Gertsch, 1971) (type) — Mexico
- C. modica (Gertsch, 1974) — Mexico
- C. pecki (Gertsch, 1971) — Mexico

== E ==
=== † Eoleptoneta ===
† Eoleptoneta Wunderlich, 1991

- † E. curvata Wunderlich, 2004
- † E. duocalcar Wunderlich, 2004
- † E. kutscheri Wunderlich, 1991
- † E. multispinae Wunderlich, 2011
- † E. pseudoarticulata Wunderlich, 2011
- † E. similis Wunderlich, 2004

== F ==
=== Falcileptoneta ===
Falcileptoneta Komatsu, 1970

- F. aichiensis Irie & Ono, 2007 — Japan
- F. amakusaensis Irie & Ono, 2005 — Japan
- F. anocellata (Chen, Zhang & Song, 1986) — China
- F. arquata (Song & Kim, 1991) — China
- F. asuwana (Nishikawa, 1981) — Japan
- F. baegunsanensis Xu, Kim, Yoo, Nam & Li, 2019 — Korea
- F. bifurca Seo, 2015 — Korea
- F. boeunensis Seo, 2015 — Korea
- F. caeca Yaginuma, 1972 — Japan
- F. chiakensis Seo, 2015 — Korea
- F. coreana (Paik & Namkung, 1969) — Korea
- F. cornuta Seo, 2015 — Korea
- F. digitalis Seo, 2015 — Korea
- F. dolsan Lan, Zhao, Kim, Yoo, Lee & Li, 2021 — Korea
- F. geumdaensis Seo, 2016 — Korea
- F. geumsanensis Seo, 2016 — Korea
- F. gotoensis Irie & Ono, 2005 — Japan
- F. hansanensis Seo, 2015 — Korea
- F. higoensis (Irie & Ono, 2003) — Japan
- F. huisunica (Zhu & Tso, 2002) — Taiwan
- F. hwanseonensis (Namkung, 1987) — Korea
- F. inabensis (Nishikawa, 1982) — Japan
- F. inagakii Irie & Ono, 2011 — Japan
- F. iriei (Komatsu, 1967) — Japan
- F. japonica (Simon, 1893) — Japan
- F. juwangensis Seo, 2015 — Korea
- F. kugoana (Komatsu, 1961) — Japan
- F. lingqiensis (Chen, Shen & Gao, 1984) — China
- F. maewhaensis Seo, 2016 — Korea
- F. melanocomata (Kishida, 1939) — Japan
- F. moakensis Seo, 2015 — Korea
- F. monodactyla (Yin, Wang & Wang, 1984) — China
- F. musculina (Komatsu, 1961) — Japan
- F. naejangenesis Seo, 2015 — Korea
- F. naejangsan Lan, Zhao, Kim, Yoo, Lee & Li, 2021 — Korea
- F. nigrabdomina (Zhu & Tso, 2002) — Taiwan
- F. odaesanensis Xu, Kim, Yoo, Nam & Li, 2019 — Korea
- F. ogatai Irie & Ono, 2007 — Japan
- F. okinawaensis Komatsu, 1972 — Japan (Okinawa)
- F. satsumaensis Irie & Ono, 2005 — Japan
- F. secula (Namkung, 1987) — Korea
- F. shuanglong Wang & Li, 2020 — China
- F. simboggulensis (Paik, 1971) — Korea
- F. soboensis Irie & Ono, 2005 — Japan
- F. speciosa (Komatsu, 1957) — Japan
- F. striata (Oi, 1952) (type) — Japan
  - F. s. fujisana Yaginuma, 1972 — Japan
- F. sunchangensis Seo, 2016 — Korea
- F. taiwanensis (Zhu & Tso, 2002) — Taiwan
- F. taizhensis (Chen & Zhang, 1993) — China
- F. tajimiensis Irie & Ono, 2011 — Japan
- F. tofacea Yaginuma, 1972 — Japan
- F. tsushimensis (Yaginuma, 1970) — Japan
- F. uenoi (Taginuma, 1963) — Japan
- F. umyeonsanensis Xu, Kim, Yoo, Nam & Li, 2019 — Korea
- F. unmunensis Seo, 2015 — Korea
- F. usihanana (Komatsu, 1961) — Japan
- F. yamauchii (Nishikawa, 1982) — Japan
- F. yebongsanensis (Kim, Lee & Namkung, 2004) — Korea
- F. yongdamgulensis (Paik & Namkung, 1969) — Korea
- F. zenjoenis (Komatsu, 1965) — Japan

== J ==
=== Jingneta ===
Jingneta Wang & Li, 2020

- J. caoxian Wang & Li, 2020 — China
- J. cornea (Tong & Li, 2008) (type) — China
- J. exilocula (Tong & Li, 2008) — China
- J. foliiformis (Tong & Li, 2008) — China
- J. jingdong Wang & Li, 2020 — China
- J. maculosa (Song & Xu, 1986) — China
- J. setulifera (Tong & Li, 2008) — China
- J. tunxiensis (Song & Xu, 1986) — China
- J. wangae (Tong & Li, 2008) — China

== L ==
=== Leptoneta ===
Leptoneta

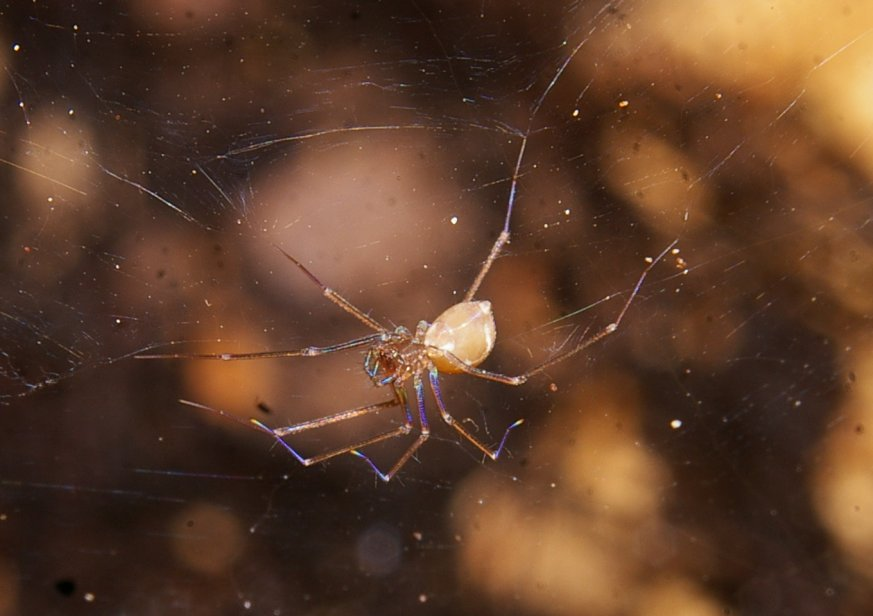
Leptoneta infuscata, female

Leptoneta Simon, 1872

- L. ciaisensis Dresco, 1987 — France
- L. comasi Ribera, 1978 — Spain
- L. condei Dresco, 1987 — France
- L. conimbricensis Machado & Ribera, 1986 — Portugal
- L. convexa Simon, 1872 (type) — France
  - L. c. aulotensis Dresco, 1990 — France
- L. corsica Fage, 1943 — France (Corsica)
- L. crypticola Simon, 1907 — France
  - L. c. franciscoloi Caporiacco, 1950 — Italy
- L. fagei Simon, 1914 — France
- L. fouresi Dresco, 1979 — France
- L. handeulgulensis Namkung, 2002 — Korea
- L. hogyegulensis Paik & Namkung, 1969 — Korea
- L. hongdoensis Paik, 1980 — Korea
- L. infuscata Simon, 1872 — Spain (mainland, Majorca), France
  - L. i. ovetana Machado, 1939 — Spain
- L. insularis Roewer, 1953 — Italy (Sardinia)
- L. jangsanensis Seo, 1989 — Korea
- L. jeanneli Simon, 1907 — France
- L. kernensis Simon, 1910 — Algeria
- L. kwangreungensis Kim, Jung, Kim & Lee, 2004 — Korea
- L. lantosquensis Dresco, 1987 — France
- L. leucophthalma Simon, 1907 — Spain, France
- L. manca Fage, 1913 — France
- L. microphthalma Simon, 1872 — France
- L. naejangsanensis Kim, Yoo & Lee, 2016 — Korea
- L. namhensis Paik & Seo, 1982 — Korea
- L. namkungi Kim, Jung, Kim & Lee, 2004 — Korea
- L. olivacea Simon, 1882 — France
- L. paikmyeonggulensis Paik & Seo, 1984 — Korea
- L. paroculus Simon, 1907 — Spain, France
- L. patrizii Roewer, 1953 — Italy (Sardinia)
- L. proserpina Simon, 1907 — France
- L. seogwipoensis Kim, Ye & Kim, 2015 — Korea
- L. serbariuana Roewer, 1953 — Italy (Sardinia)
- L. soryongensis Paik & Namkung, 1969 — Korea
- L. spinipalpus Kim, Lee & Namkung, 2004 — Korea
- L. taeguensis Paik, 1985 — Korea
- L. taramellii Roewer, 1956 — Italy (Sardinia)
- L. trabucensis Simon, 1907 — France
- L. vittata Fage, 1913 — France
- L. waheulgulensis Namkung, 1991 — Korea
- L. yongyeonensis Seo, 1989 — Korea
- L. abeillei Simon, 1882 – Spain, France
- L. albera Simon, 1882 – France
- L. alpica Simon, 1882 – France
- L. berlandi Machado & Ribera, 1986 – Portugal
- L. cavalairensis Dresco, 1987 – France
- L. chilbosanensis Kim, Yoo & Lee, 2016 — Korea
- L. ciaisensis Dresco, 1987 – France
- L. comasi Ribera, 1978 – Spain
- L. condei Dresco, 1987 – France
- L. conimbricensis Machado & Ribera, 1986 – Portugal
- L. convexa Simon, 1872 (type) – France
  - Leptoneta c. aulotensis Dresco, 1990 – France
- L. cornea Tong & Li, 2008 – China
- L. corsica Fage, 1943 – France (Corsica)
- L. crypticola Simon, 1907 – France
  - Leptoneta c. franciscoloi Caporiacco, 1950 – Italy
- L. fagei Simon, 1914 – France
- L. fouresi Dresco, 1979 – France
- L. handeulgulensis Namkung, 2002 – Korea
- L. hogyegulensis Paik & Namkung, 1969 – Korea
- L. hongdoensis Paik, 1980 – Korea
- L. infuscata Simon, 1872 – Spain (mainland, Majorca), France
  - Leptoneta i. ovetana Machado, 1939 – Spain
- L. insularis Roewer, 1953 – Sardinia
- L. jangsanensis Seo, 1989 – Korea
- L. jeanneli Simon, 1907 – France
- L. kernensis Simon, 1910 – Algeria
- L. kwangreungensis Kim, Jung, Kim & Lee, 2004 – Korea
- L. lantosquensis Dresco, 1987 – France
- L. leucophthalma Simon, 1907 – Spain
- L. manca Fage, 1913 – France
- L. miaoshiensis Chen & Zhang, 1993 – China
- L. microphthalma Simon, 1872 – France
- L. naejangsanensis Paik & Seo, 1982 – Korea
- L. namhensis Paik & Seo, 1982 – Korea
- L. namkungi Kim, Jung, Kim & Lee, 2004 – Korea
- L. olivacea Simon, 1882 – France
- L. paikmyeonggulensis Paik & Seo, 1984 – Korea
- L. paroculus Simon, 1907 – Spain
- L. patrizii Roewer, 1953 – Sardinia
- L. proserpina Simon, 1907 – France
- L. seogwipoensis Kim, Ye & Kim, 2015 – Korea
- L. serbariuana Roewer, 1953 – Sardinia
- L. soryongensis Paik & Namkung, 1969 – Korea
- L. spinipalpus Kim, Lee & Namkung, 2004 – Korea
- L. taeguensis Paik, 1985 – Korea
- L. taramellii Roewer, 1956 – Sardinia
- L. trabucensis Simon, 1907 – France
- L. vittata Fage, 1913 – France
- L. waheulgulensis Namkung, 1991 – Korea
- L. yongyeonensis Seo, 1989 – Korea

=== Leptonetela ===
Leptonetela Kratochvíl, 1978

- L. andreevi Deltshev, 1985 – Greece
- L. anshun Lin & Li, 2010 – China
- L. arvanitidisi Wang & Li, 2016 – Greece
- L. bama Lin & Li, 2010 – China
- L. biocellata He, Liu, Xu, Yin & Peng, 2019 – China
- L. caucasica Dunin, 1990 – Caucasus (Russia, Georgia, Azerbaijan), Iran?
- L. chakou Wang & Li, 2017 – China
- L. changtu Wang & Li, 2017 – China
- L. chenjia Wang & Li, 2017 – China
- L. chiosensis Wang & Li, 2011 – Greece
- L. chuan Wang & Li, 2017 – China
- L. curvispinosa Lin & Li, 2010 – China
- L. dabian Wang & Li, 2017 – China
- L. danxia Lin & Li, 2010 – China
- L. dao Wang & Li, 2017 – China
- L. dashui Wang & Li, 2017 – China
- L. deltshevi (Brignoli, 1979) – Turkey
- L. digitata Lin & Li, 2010 – China
- L. encun Wang & Li, 2017 – China
- L. erlong Wang & Li, 2017 – China
- L. falcata (Chen, Gao & Zhu, 2000) – China
- L. feilong Wang & Li, 2017 – China
- L. flabellaris Wang & Li, 2011 – China
- L. furcaspina Lin & Li, 2010 – China
- L. gang Wang & Li, 2017 – China
- L. geminispina Lin & Li, 2010 – China
- L. gigachela (Lin & Li, 2010) – China
- L. gittenbergeri Wang & Li, 2011 – Greece
- L. grandispina Lin & Li, 2010 – China
- L. gubin Wang & Li, 2017 – China
- L. hamata Lin & Li, 2010 – China
- L. hangzhouensis (Chen, Shen & Gao, 1984) – China
- L. hexacantha Lin & Li, 2010 – China
- L. huoyan Wang & Li, 2017 – China
- L. identica (Chen, Jia & Wang, 2010) – China
- L. jiahe Wang & Li, 2017 – China
- L. jinsha Lin & Li, 2010 – China
- L. jiulong Lin & Li, 2010 – China
- L. kanellisi (Deeleman-Reinhold, 1971) (type) – Greece
- L. kangsa Wang & Li, 2017 – China
- L. la Wang & Li, 2017 – China
- L. langdong Wang & Li, 2017 – China
- L. latapicalis He, Liu, Xu, Yin & Peng, 2019 – China
- L. liangfeng Wang & Li, 2017 – China
- L. lianhua Wang & Li, 2017 – China
- L. lihu Wang & Li, 2017 – China
- L. lineata Wang & Li, 2011 – China
- L. liping Lin & Li, 2010 – China
- L. liuguan Wang & Li, 2017 – China
- L. liuzhai Wang & Li, 2017 – China
- L. longli Wang & Li, 2017 – China
- L. longyu Wang & Li, 2017 – China
- L. lophacantha (Chen, Jia & Wang, 2010) – China
- L. lujia Wang & Li, 2017 – China
- L. martensi (Zhu & Li, 2021) – China
- L. maxillacostata Lin & Li, 2010 – China
- L. mayang Wang & Li, 2017 – China
- L. megaloda (Chen, Jia & Wang, 2010) – China
- L. meitan Lin & Li, 2010 – China
- L. meiwang Wang & Li, 2017 – China
- L. mengzongensis Wang & Li, 2011 – China
- L. miaoshiensis (Chen & Zhang, 1993) – China
- L. microdonta (Xu & Song, 1983) – China
- L. mita Wang & Li, 2011 – China
- L. nanmu Wang & Li, 2017 – China
- L. niubizi Wang & Li, 2017 – China
- L. notabilis (Lin & Li, 2010) – China
- L. nuda (Chen, Jia & Wang, 2010) – China
- L. oktocantha Lin & Li, 2010 – China
- L. palmata Lin & Li, 2010 – China
- L. panbao Wang & Li, 2017 – China
- L. paragamiani Wang & Li, 2016 – Greece
- L. parlonga Wang & Li, 2011 – China
- L. penevi Wang & Li, 2016 – Greece
- L. pentakis Lin & Li, 2010 – China
- L. pungitia Wang & Li, 2011 – Vietnam
- L. qiangdao Wang & Li, 2017 – China
- L. quinquespinata (Chen & Zhu, 2008) – China
- L. reticulopecta Lin & Li, 2010 – China
- L. robustispina (Chen, Jia & Wang, 2010) – China
- L. rudicula Wang & Li, 2011 – China
- L. rudong Wang & Li, 2017 – China
- L. sanchahe Wang & Li, 2017 – China
- L. sanyan Wang & Li, 2017 – China
- L. sexdentata Wang & Li, 2011 – China
- L. sexdigiti (Lin & Li, 2010) – China
- L. shanji Wang & Li, 2017 – China
- L. shibingensis Guo, Yu & Chen, 2016 – China
- L. shicheng Wang & Li, 2017 – China
- L. shuang Wang & Li, 2017 – China
- L. shuilian Wang & Li, 2017 – China
- L. strinatii (Brignoli, 1976) – Greece
- L. suae Lin & Li, 2010 – China
- L. taixu (Zhu & Li, 2021) – China
- L. tangi He, Liu, Xu, Yin & Peng, 2019 – China
- L. tawo Wang & Li, 2017 – China
- L. tetracantha Lin & Li, 2010 – China
- L. thracia Gasparo, 2005 – Greece
- L. tiankeng Wang & Li, 2017 – China
- L. tianxinensis (Tong & Li, 2008) – China
- L. tianxingensis Wang & Li, 2011 – China
- L. tongzi Lin & Li, 2010 – China
- L. trispinosa (Yin, Wang & Wang, 1984) – China
- L. turcica (Danışman & Coşar, 2021) – Turkey
- L. unispinosa (Yin, Wang & Wang, 1984) – China
- L. wangjia Wang & Li, 2017 – China
- L. wenzhu Wang & Li, 2017 – China
- L. wuming Wang & Li, 2017 – China
- L. xianren Wang & Li, 2017 – China
- L. xianwu (Zhu & Li, 2021) – China
- L. xiaoyan Wang & Li, 2017 – China
- L. xinglong (Zhu & Li, 2021) – China
- L. xinhua Wang & Li, 2017 – China
- L. xui (Chen, Gao & Zhu, 2000) — China
- L. yangi Lin & Li, 2010 – China
- L. yaoi Wang & Li, 2011 – China
- L. zakou Wang & Li, 2017 – China
- L. zhai Wang & Li, 2011 – China

=== Longileptoneta ===
Longileptoneta Seo, 2015

- L. buyongsan Lan, Zhao, Kim, Yoo, Lee & Li, 2021 — Korea
- L. byeonsanbando Lan, Zhao, Kim, Yoo, Lee & Li, 2021 — Korea
- L. gachangensis Seo, 2016 — Korea
- L. gayaensis Seo, 2016 — Korea
- L. gutan Wang & Li, 2020 — China
- L. huanglongensis (Chen, Zhang & Song, 1982) — China
- L. huangshan Wang & Li, 2020 — China
- L. jangseongensis Seo, 2016 — Korea
- L. jirisan Lan, Zhao, Kim, Yoo, Lee & Li, 2021 — Korea
- L. shenxian Wang & Li, 2020 — China
- L. songniensis Seo, 2015 (type) — Korea
- L. weolakensis Seo, 2016 — Korea
- L. yeren Wang & Li, 2020 — China
- L. zhuxian Wang & Li, 2020 — China

== M ==
=== Masirana ===
Masirana Kishida, 1942

- M. abensis (Kobayashi, 1973) — Japan
- M. akahanei Komatsu, 1963 — Japan
- M. akiyoshiensis (Oi, 1958) — Japan
  - M. a. imperatoria Komatsu, 1974 — Japan
  - M. a. kagekiyoi Komatsu, 1974 — Japan
  - M. a. primocreata Komatsu, 1974 — Japan
- M. bandoi (Nishikawa, 1986) — Japan
- M. bonghwaensis Seo, 2015 — Korea
- M. changlini (Zhu & Tso, 2002) — Taiwan
- M. chibusana (Irie, 2000) — Japan
- M. cinevacea Kishida, 1942 (type) — Japan
- M. flabelli Seo, 2015 — Korea
- M. glabra (Komatsu, 1957) — Japan
- M. ilweolensis Seo, 2015 — Korea
- M. kawasawai (Komatsu, 1970) — Japan
- M. kinoshitai (Irie, 2000) — Japan
- M. kosodeensis Komatsu, 1963 — Japan
- M. kuramotoi Komatsu, 1974 — Japan
- M. kusunoensis Irie & Ono, 2010 — Japan
- M. kyokoae Yaginuma, 1972 — Japan
- M. longimana Yaginuma, 1970 — Japan
- M. longipalpis Komatsu, 1972 — Japan (Okinawa)
- M. mizonokuchiensis Irie & Ono, 2005 — Japan
- M. nippara Komatsu, 1957 — Japan
- M. silvicola (Kobayashi, 1973) — Japan
- M. taioensis Irie & Ono, 2005 — Japan
- M. taraensis Irie & Ono, 2005 — Japan

=== Montanineta ===
Montanineta Ledford & Griswold, 2011

- M. sandra (Gertsch, 1974) (type) — USA

== N ==
=== Neoleptoneta ===
Neoleptoneta Brignoli, 1972

- N. bonita (Gertsch, 1974) — Mexico
- N. brunnea (Gertsch, 1974) — Mexico
- N. caliginosa Brignoli, 1977 — Mexico
- N. capilla (Gertsch, 1971) (type) — Mexico
- N. delicata (Gertsch, 1971) — Mexico
- N. limpida (Gertsch, 1974) — Mexico
- N. rainesi (Gertsch, 1971) — Mexico
- N. reclusa (Gertsch, 1971) — Mexico

== O ==
=== † Oligoleptoneta ===
† Oligoleptoneta Wunderlich, 2004 - Leptonetinae

- † O. altoculus Wunderlich, 2004
- † O. cymbiospina Wunderlich, 2011

=== Ozarkia ===
Ozarkia Ledford & Griswold, 2011

- O. alabama (Gertsch, 1974) (type) — USA
- O. apachea (Gertsch, 1974) — USA
- O. archeri (Gertsch, 1974) — USA
- O. arkansa (Gertsch, 1974) — USA
- O. blanda (Gertsch, 1974) — USA
- O. georgia (Gertsch, 1974) — USA
- O. iviei (Gertsch, 1974) — USA
- O. novaegalleciae (Brignoli, 1979) — USA
- O. serena (Gertsch, 1974) — USA

== P ==
=== Paraleptoneta ===
Paraleptoneta Fage, 1913

- P. bellesi Ribera & Lopez, 1982 — Tunisia
- P. spinimana (Simon, 1884) (type) — Algeria, France, Italy

=== Protoleptoneta ===
Protoleptoneta Deltshev, 1972

- P. baccettii (Brignoli, 1979) — Italy
- P. beroni Deltshev, 1977 — Bulgaria
- P. bulgarica Deltshev, 1972 (type) — Bulgaria
- P. italica (Simon, 1907) — France, Italy, Austria

== R ==
=== Rhyssoleptoneta ===
Rhyssoleptoneta Tong & Li, 2007

- R. aosen (Zhu & Li, 2021) — China
- R. latitarsa Tong & Li, 2007 (type) — China

== S ==
=== Sulcia ===
Sulcia Kratochvíl, 1938

- S. armata Kratochvíl, 1978 — Montenegro
- S. cretica Fage, 1945 — Greece (Crete)
  - S. c. lindbergi Dresco, 1962 — Albania, Greece
  - S. c. violacea Brignoli, 1974 — Greece
- S. inferna Kratochvíl, 1938 — Croatia
- S. mirabilis Kratochvíl, 1938 — Montenegro
- S. montenegrina (Kratochvíl & Miller, 1939) — Montenegro
- S. nocturna Kratochvíl, 1938 (type) — Croatia
- S. occulta Kratochvíl, 1938 — Bosnia and Herzegovina, Serbia
- S. orientalis (Kulczyński, 1914) — Bosnia and Herzegovina

== T ==
=== Tayshaneta ===
Tayshaneta

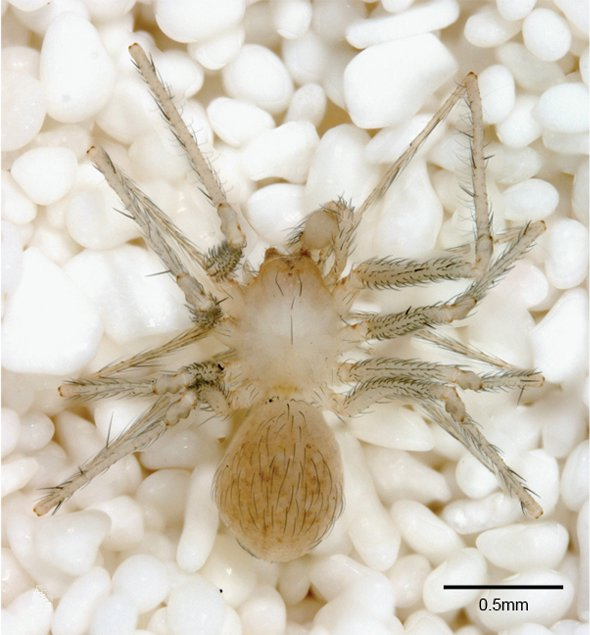
Tayshaneta anopica

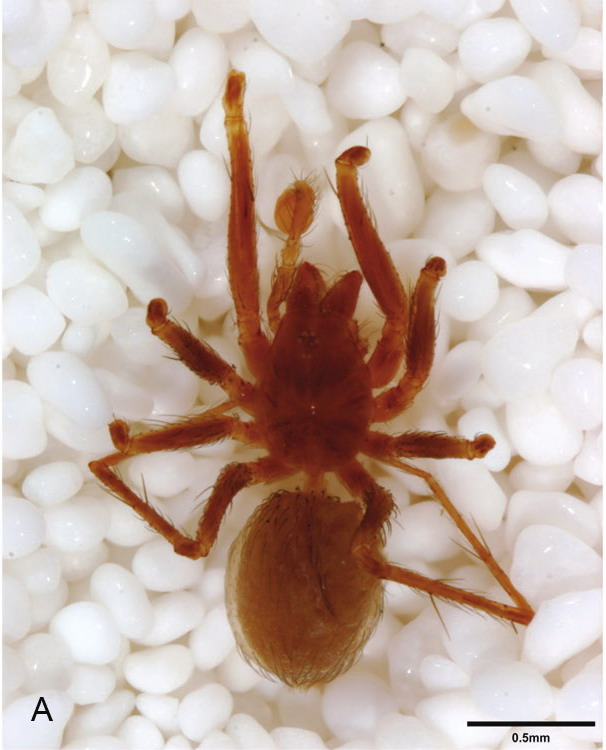
Tayshaneta archambaulti

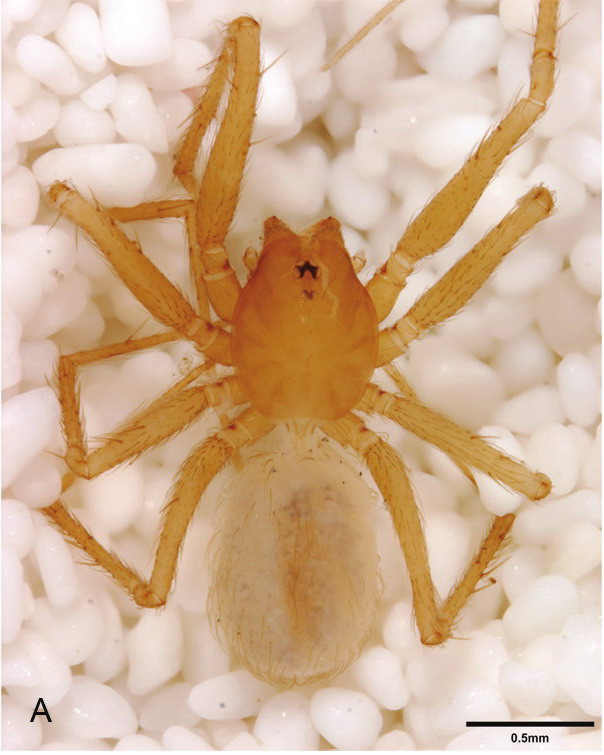
Tayshaneta bullis

Tayshaneta Ledford & Griswold, 2011

- T. anopica (Gertsch, 1974) — USA
- T. archambaulti Ledford, Paquin, Cokendolpher, Campbell & Griswold, 2012 — USA
- T. bullis (Cokendolpher, 2004) — USA
- T. coeca (Chamberlin & Ivie, 1942) (type) — USA
- T. concinna (Gertsch, 1974) — USA
- T. devia (Gertsch, 1974) — USA
- T. emeraldae Ledford, Paquin, Cokendolpher, Campbell & Griswold, 2012 — USA
- T. fawcetti Ledford, Paquin, Cokendolpher, Campbell & Griswold, 2012 — USA
- T. grubbsi Ledford, Paquin, Cokendolpher, Campbell & Griswold, 2012 — USA
- T. madla Ledford, Paquin, Cokendolpher, Campbell & Griswold, 2012 — USA
- T. microps (Gertsch, 1974) — USA
- T. myopica (Gertsch, 1974) — USA
- T. oconnorae Ledford, Paquin, Cokendolpher, Campbell & Griswold, 2012 — USA
- T. paraconcinna (Cokendolpher & Reddell, 2001) — USA
- T. sandersi Ledford, Paquin, Cokendolpher, Campbell & Griswold, 2012 — USA
- T. sprousei Ledford, Paquin, Cokendolpher, Campbell & Griswold, 2012 — USA
- T. valverdae (Gertsch, 1974) — USA
- T. vidrio Ledford, Paquin, Cokendolpher, Campbell & Griswold, 2012 — USA
- T. whitei Ledford, Paquin, Cokendolpher, Campbell & Griswold, 2012 — USA

=== Teloleptoneta ===
Teloleptoneta Ribera, 1988

- T. synthetica (Machado, 1951) (type) — Portugal
