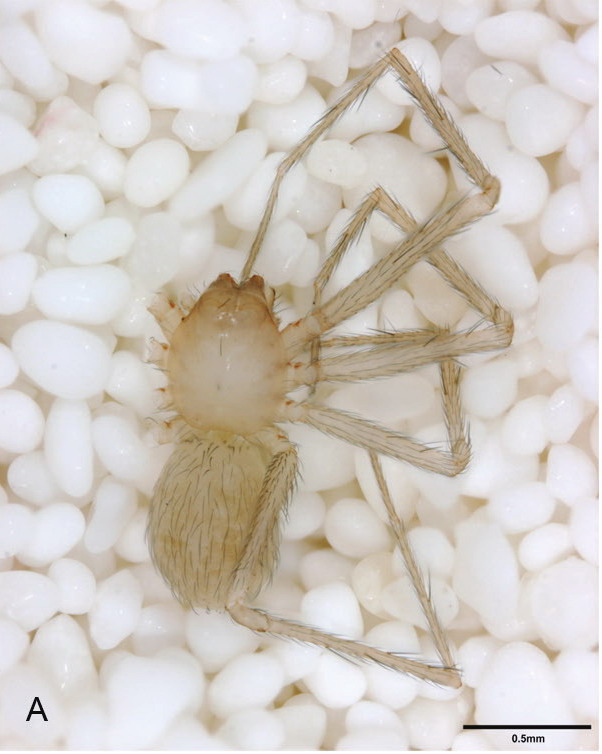

Conservation status
- Critically Imperiled (NatureServe)

Scientific classification
- Kingdom: Animalia
- Phylum: Arthropoda
- Subphylum: Chelicerata
- Class: Arachnida
- Order: Araneae
- Infraorder: Araneomorphae
- Family: Leptonetidae
- Genus: Tayshaneta
- Species: T. microps

Binomial name
- Tayshaneta microps (Gertsch, 1974)

Synonyms
- Leptoneta microps Gertsch, 1974; Neoleptoneta microps (Gertsch, 1974)

= Tayshaneta microps =

Government Canyon bat cave spider Tayshaneta microps

Species of spider

Tayshaneta microps, synonym Neoleptoneta microps, is a rare species of spider in the family Leptonetidae known by the common name Government Canyon bat cave spider. It is endemic to Texas in the United States, where it is known to be found in two caves in Bexar County. It is one of two in its genus listed as endangered species in 2000. It is a troglobite, an animal which spends its entire life in caves.

== Description ==
Tayshaneta microps has a hard light brown bristle bearing shell known as a carapace. Its legs are elongated and thin covered in hair-like structures called setae with few scattered spines. The abdomen is pale to yellow-brown and is also covered in setae.

The typical body length is 1.35mm(0.053 inches) which can be divided into subparts. The caraspace - hard outer shell - is typically 0.64mm (0.0252inches) long and 0.56mm (0.022 inches) wide. The abdomen of the Tayshaneta microps is approximately 0.7mm (0.0276 inches) and 0.54mm (0.0213inches) wide.

== Life history ==
Since Tayshaneta microps is a troglobite, it is difficult for scientists to capture and study them. The caves that these spiders reside in have more caves than entrances and ninety percent of them are closed off from human access. Therefore, scientists for the most part are unable to study these spiders.

According to Professor Joel Ledford of UC Davis, for the most part, there is no information currently available on Tayshaneta microps life history.

=== Development ===
Egg sacs for another related species only contained a few eggs. No information available yet on larval stage, nymph stage, adult stage.

=== Development growth rate ===
No information currently available.

=== Age and size at sexual maturity ===
No information currently available.

=== Reproductive cycle ===
No information currently available.

=== Timing of reproduction ===
No information currently available on number and size of offspring and sex ratio of offspring.

=== Offspring quality and quantity ===
No information currently available.

=== Age of dispersal ===
Tayshenata species live sedentary lives living mainly in webs for their whole life except for males who may sometimes leave upon maturity. They do not disperse far as they are known only from two caves.

=== Annual dormancy ===
No information currently available.

=== Age-specific mortality rates ===
No information currently available.

== Ecology ==
=== Diet ===
Due to the difficulty of viewing the species and their rarity the exact diet of the Government Canyon Bat Cave Spider is not known. However, it is believed that Taysheneta microps feed on the eggs, larvae, or other adult invertebrates living in the cave.

=== Behavior ===
As scientists have been unable to view many individuals in the Government Canyon Bat Cave species it has been challenging and rare to view their behavior. This is believed to be due to the species dwelling inside portions of the karst cave that are inaccessible to humans. What we do know from the few observed Government Canyon Bat Cave spiders and closely related species is the kind of webs they form and some base behavior. Taysheneta microps has been observed forming small sheet webs under material breakdown, decomposing biomass i.e. guano, and is thought to be mostly sedentary living in their webs their whole life

=== Habitat ===
Tayshenata microps lives in karst limestone caves and are an obligate species. The spiders can no longer have the ability to live in a drier environment so they have to live in the conditions the caves provide. These caves are high in humidity and maintain stable temperatures. The spiders will retreat to a deeper, more habitable portion of the cave in extreme conditions outside the cave.

=== Range ===
Taysheneta microps live two caves within Bexar County, Texas. The names of the caves are Government Canyon Bat Cave and Surprise Sink. The spiders may have been found in a third cave, the Madia cave, but the species identity was never confirmed. If these unidentified spiders were classified as Tayshenata microps, then the occupation range would extend to include the Helotes Karst cave region. Currently, the species has a range less than 100 km and global abundance has yet to be determined.

== Conservation ==
=== Population size ===
Population size estimates are currently unknown due to limited individuals and inaccessible cave locations. About ninety percent of caves in Bexar County are sealed from human entrance, preventing further research on Tayshaneta microps. Studies suggest that troglobites are neither rare nor associated with the stability issues of small populations. However, due to both the lack of information and access regarding Bexar County invertebrates, such concerns cannot be ruled out.

=== Past and current geographical distribution ===
Tayshaneta microps are known to live in two caves in the Government Canyon State Natural Area, Northern Bexar County, Texas. While the two individuals obtained from Surprise Sink share the reduced eyes of Tayshaneta microps, they have not yet been confirmed as members of the species. Lack of confirmation is due to immaturity and an absence of associated males. Despite numerous sampling efforts, no additional prior or current habitats have been identified

=== Major threats ===
The most widespread threats to Tayshaneta microps are urbanization, population growth and habitat loss. Such factors are amplified by the rapidly expanding city, San Antonio, in Bexar County, Texas. The growth of San Antonio, accompanied by its anthropogenic impacts, has posed many challenges for the species. For example, the karst topography occupied by Tayshaneta microps consists of brittle, limestone caves abundant with sinks, fractures, and fissures. Such environments remain vulnerable to slight movements, often induced by humans. Direct habitat loss often arrives in the form of rock quarrying and filling in cave entrances. These actions prompt the loss of permeability and movement routes for invertebrates. The following are examples of indirect habitat degradation: changing draining paths, displacing native plant and animal species, pollution from septic networks and run-off, and predation or competition via invasive species.

Fire ants present the most plausible nonnative threat to Tayshaneta microps. Despite no observations of the species being preyed upon, a negative correlation does exist between arthropod diversity and fire ant presence. Closely related arthropods in Travis and Williamson Counties, Texas, have been observed to fall prey to fire ants. Such evidence leads experts to believe that Bexar County invertebrates are similarly affected by fire ant competition and predation. Additionally, researchers suspect that Tayshaneta microps may exist in adjacent caves on privately owned land. Due to the regulations associated with land ownership, the preservation of potential arthropod habitats is dependent on consultations with landowners

=== Listing under the ESA ===
The United States Fish and Wildlife Service (USFWS) received a petition on January 16, 1992, to add Neoleptoneta microps to the List of Threatened and Endangered Wildlife. This petition included eight additional invertebrates of Bexar County. Dated January 9, 1992, the petition was submitted by the following groups: Patricia K. Cunningham of the Helotes Creek Association, the Balcones Canyonlands Conservation Coalition, the Texas Speleological Association, the Alamo Group of the Sierra Club, and the Texas Cave Management Association. All nine invertebrates were listed as endangered by the USFWS on December 26, 2000.

=== 5-year review ===
The USFWS began a 5-year status review of Neoleptoneta microps in 2021. Their endangered status has been maintained, receiving no further updates. After the Neoleptoneta genus was altered to include only seven species of central Mexico, the USFWS updated their taxonomic classification to Tayshaneta microps on November 26, 2021

=== Species status assessment ===
A species status assessment for Tayshaneta microps is not available at this time.

=== Recovery plan ===
The USFWS drafted a recovery plan for endangered karst invertebrates on September 12, 2011. The draft was later finalized on October 4, 2011. Conservation biologists developed many recommendations based on “karst faunal regions” (KFR's). KFRs are classified as distinct, protected cave areas to assist in the recovery of endangered karst invertebrates. In order to ensure a high probability of Tayshaneta microps’ long-term survival, biologists advocate for the protection of an “adequate quantity and quality” (90% chance of species survival over 100 years) of karst areas. The maintenance of KFRs calls for the elimination of the following: extensive human visitation, native plant and animal disturbance, invasive fire ants, and pollution. Additionally, the USFWS recommends the use of adaptive management actions to control both current and new threats. Due to limited information, recovery is also dependent on further research to establish new areas of Tayshaneta microps presence. Such research will work in tandem with outreach efforts to educate the public about endangered karst invertebrates. The USFWS estimates a timeframe of 20 years to accomplish the delisting of Tayshaneta microps if its recovery actions are sufficiently funded and implemented
