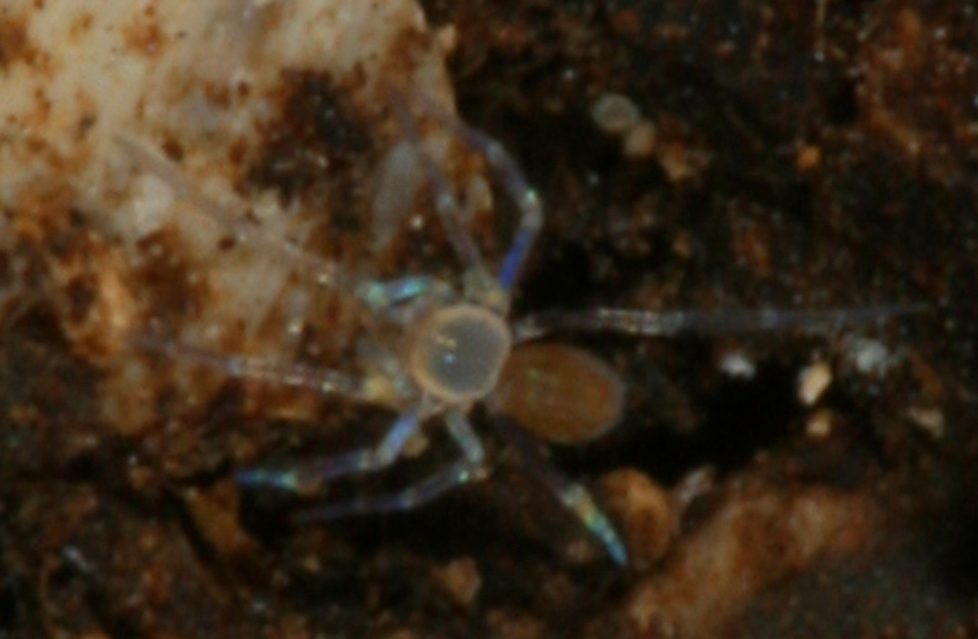
- Tooth Cave spider from Gallifer Cave, Travis County, TX

Conservation status
- Data Deficient (IUCN 2.3)

- Critically Imperiled (NatureServe)
- Endangered (ESA)

Scientific classification
- Kingdom: Animalia
- Phylum: Arthropoda
- Subphylum: Chelicerata
- Class: Arachnida
- Order: Araneae
- Infraorder: Araneomorphae
- Family: Leptonetidae
- Genus: Tayshaneta
- Species: T. myopica

Binomial name
- Tayshaneta myopica (Gertsch, 1974)

Synonyms
- Leptoneta myopica Gertsch, 1974; Neoleptoneta myopica (Gertsch, 1974)

= Tooth Cave spider =

Species of spider

The Tooth Cave spider, formerly Neoleptoneta myopica, now Tayshaneta myopica, is a 1.6 mm (1/16 in) long spider in the family Leptonetidae. It is endemic to limestone caves near Austin, Texas in the United States and is considered an endangered species.

== Taxonomy ==
The Tooth Cave spider was first described in 1974 by Willis J. Gertsch, as Leptoneta myopica. At the time it was only known from Tooth Cave in Travis County, Texas, 15 miles northwest of Austin. The specific name myopica is from the Greek myopia, "nearsighted". In 1977, Paolo Brignoli transferred the species to the genus Neoleptoneta. A 2011 phylogenetic study of Neoleptoneta and other North American genera in the family Leptonetidae showed that Neoleptoneta was not monophyletic. Several new genera were erected, including Tayshaneta, to which the Tooth Cave spider was transferred, as Tayshaneta myopica.

== Description ==
Tayshaneta myopica is a small spider, about 1.6 mm (1/16 in) in total body length. Relative to its body, it has long legs: the first leg, the longest, is about 4.3 mm (3/16 in), the third leg, the shortest, about 2.9 mm (1/8 in). It is generally whitish in color with some yellower parts. It has six eyes, a group of four at the front and two behind. The eyes were initially described as "obsolescent" and without dark pigment. Later it was discovered that the species occurs in a range of forms, from depigmented, blind individuals to darkly pigmented, large-eyed individuals.

Little is known of the life history of any of the species in the family Leptonetidae.

== Distribution and habitat ==
In 2012, Tayshaneta myopica was known from caves in Travis County and Williamson County to the northwest of Austin, Texas. Six locations were given on a distribution map for the species, although precise details of the locations have not been given, partly for conservation reasons. The caves occur in Edward's Plateau, a limestone ("karst") region of Central Texas. Tayshaneta spiders appear to spend most of their lives in their web, except for mature males. However, individuals of T. myopica from four nearby caves (Tooth Cave, Root Cave, Gallifer Cave and Tight Pit) have been shown to have identical mitochondrial and nuclear DNA haplotypes, suggesting that movement between the sites does take place. Individuals were seen suspended beneath low sheet webs, from which they dropped when disturbed.

== Conservation ==
Tayshaneta myopica was listed under the U.S. Endangered Species Act in 1988 because of its very limited distribution in an area outside of Austin, Texas, that is rapidly urbanizing. Conservation efforts have been focused on "karst faunal regions".

== See also ==
- Texella reddelli
- Texella reyesi
