= Icariella =

Scientific classification
- Kingdom: Animalia
- Phylum: Arthropoda
- Subphylum: Chelicerata
- Class: Arachnida
- Order: Araneae
- Infraorder: Araneomorphae
- Family: Linyphiidae
- Genus: Icariella; Brignoli, 1979
- Species: I. hauseri

Binomial name
- Icariella hauseri Brignoli, 1979

Genus of spiders

Icariella is a monotypic genus of Balkan dwarf spiders containing the single species, Icariella hauseri. It was first described by Paolo Marcello Brignoli in 1979, and has been found only in Greece.
