= Archoleptoneta gertschi =

Scientific classification
- Kingdom: Animalia
- Phylum: Arthropoda
- Subphylum: Chelicerata
- Class: Arachnida
- Order: Araneae
- Infraorder: Araneomorphae
- Family: Archoleptonetidae
- Genus: Archoleptoneta
- Species: A. gertschi

Binomial name
- Archoleptoneta gertschi Ledford & Griswold, 2010

Species of spider

Archoleptoneta gertschi is a species of spider. It is known in a small area of California.

The species was named after Willis J. Gertsch who described many species of North American arachnids.
