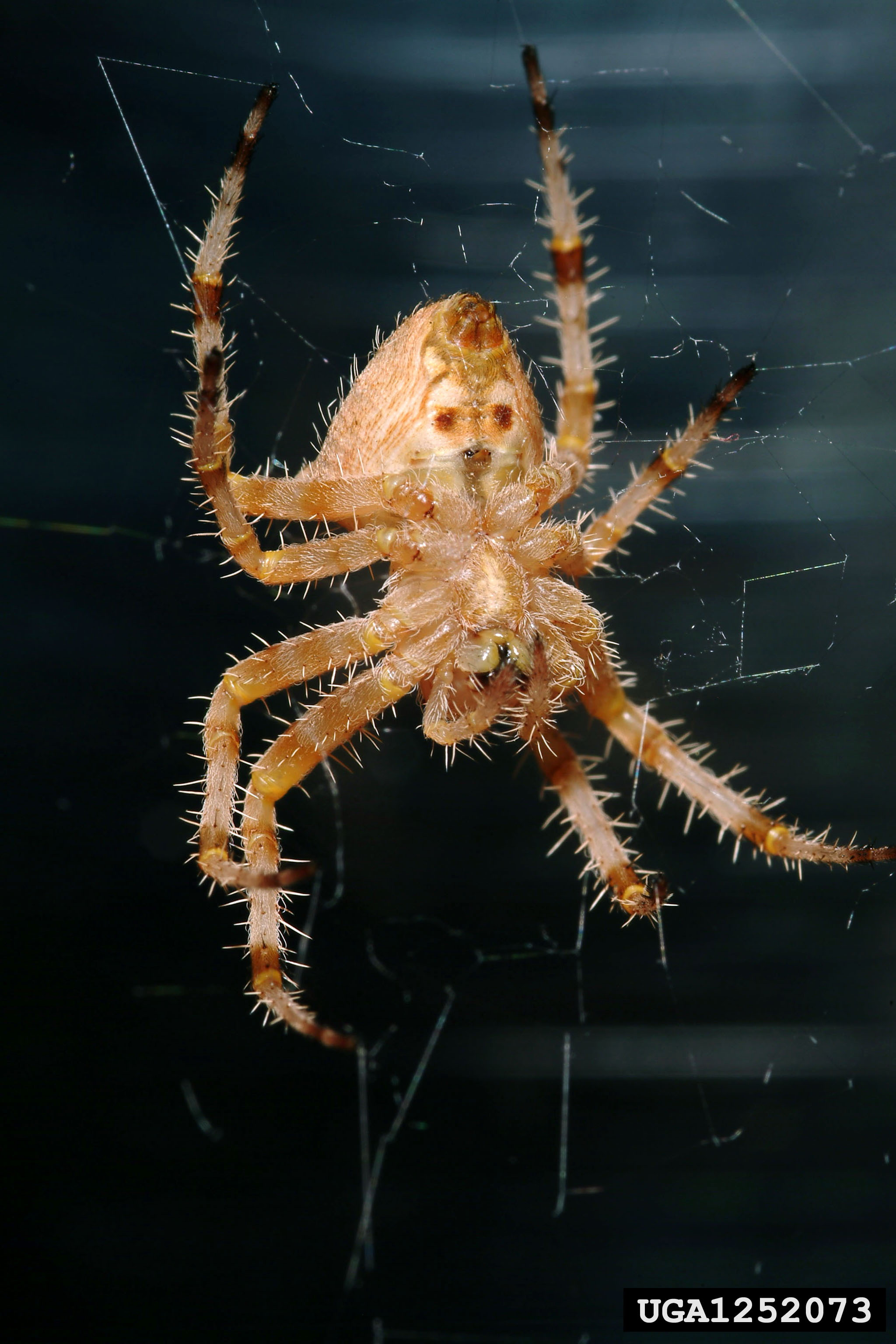

Scientific classification
- Domain: Eukaryota
- Kingdom: Animalia
- Phylum: Arthropoda
- Subphylum: Chelicerata
- Class: Arachnida
- Order: Araneae
- Infraorder: Araneomorphae
- Family: Araneidae
- Genus: Araneus
- Species: A. illaudatus

Binomial name
- Araneus illaudatus (Gertsch & Mulaik, 1936)

Synonyms
- Aranea illaudata Araneus pima

= Araneus illaudatus =

Species of spider

Araneus illaudatus, commonly called the Texas orb-weaver, is a species of spider belonging to the family Araneidae. It has a rather restricted range in western Texas and eastern Arizona.

The female is a very large, hairy orb-weaver, up to 25 mm in length (excluding legs). The overall color is a dirty white, sometimes with a pinkish tinge. A distinctive feature is the presence of two roughly triangular dark patches at the front of the abdomen, each with a small white spot within. The male is very much smaller, only reaching 9 mm in length.
