= Pararana =

Scientific classification
- Kingdom: Animalia
- Phylum: Arthropoda
- Subphylum: Chelicerata
- Class: Arachnida
- Order: Araneae
- Infraorder: Araneomorphae
- Family: Leptonetidae
- Genus: Pararana; Lin & Li, 2022

Type species
- P. gaofani Lin & Li, 2022

Species
- 4, see text

Genus of spiders

Pararana is a genus of spiders in the family Leptonetidae.

== Distribution ==
All described species are endemic to China.

== Etymology ==
The genus name is a combination of Ancient Greek παρα- "para-" (next to) and the related genus Masirana.

== Species ==
As of October 2025, this genus includes four species:

- Pararana gaofani Lin & Li, 2022 – China (type species)
- Pararana jiufushanensis Yao & K. K. Liu, 2025 – China
- Pararana mingxuani Yao & Liu, 2024 – China
- Pararana songyuani Yao & K. K. Liu, 2025 – China
