= Jalapyphantes =

Scientific classification
- Kingdom: Animalia
- Phylum: Arthropoda
- Subphylum: Chelicerata
- Class: Arachnida
- Order: Araneae
- Infraorder: Araneomorphae
- Family: Linyphiidae
- Genus: Jalapyphantes; Gertsch & Davis, 1946

Type species
- J. cuernavaca Gertsch & Davis, 1946

Species
- 4, see text

Genus of spiders

Jalapyphantes is a genus of dwarf spiders that was first described by Carl Eduard Adolph Gerstaecker & L. I. Davis in 1946.

== Species ==
The genus includes the following species, found in Ecuador and Mexico:

- Jalapyphantes cuernavaca Gertsch & Davis, 1946 (type) – Mexico
- Jalapyphantes minoratus Gertsch & Davis, 1946 – Mexico
- Jalapyphantes obscurus Millidge, 1991 – Ecuador
- Jalapyphantes puebla Gertsch & Davis, 1946 – Mexico
- Jalapyphantes tricolor Silva-Moreira & Hormiga, 2021 – Mexico
