= Sosticus =

Scientific classification
- Domain: Eukaryota
- Kingdom: Animalia
- Phylum: Arthropoda
- Subphylum: Chelicerata
- Class: Arachnida
- Order: Araneae
- Infraorder: Araneomorphae
- Family: Gnaphosidae
- Genus: Sosticus; Chamberlin, 1922

Type species
- S. insularis (Banks, 1895)

Species
- 10, see text

Synonyms
- Sostogeus Chamberlin & Gertsch, 1940

Genus of spiders

Sosticus is a genus of ground spiders that was first described by R. V. Chamberlin in 1922.

== Species ==
As of May 2019 it contains ten species:

- Sosticus californicus Platnick & Shadab, 1976 – California (USA)
- Sosticus dherikanalensis Gajbe, 1979 – India
- Sosticus insularis (Banks, 1895) (type) – USA, Canada
- Sosticus jabalpurensis Bhandari & Gajbe, 2001 – India
- Sosticus loricatus (L. Koch, 1866) – Europe, Caucasus, Russia (Europe to Far East), Iran, Central Asia, China. Introduced to North America
- Sosticus nainitalensis Gajbe, 1979 – India
- Sosticus pawani Gajbe, 1993 – India
- Sosticus poonaensis Tikader, 1982 – India
- Sosticus solanensis Gajbe, 1979 – India
- Sosticus sundargarhensis Gajbe, 1979 – India
