= Pseudotyphistes =

Scientific classification
- Kingdom: Animalia
- Phylum: Arthropoda
- Subphylum: Chelicerata
- Class: Arachnida
- Order: Araneae
- Infraorder: Araneomorphae
- Family: Linyphiidae
- Genus: Pseudotyphistes; Brignoli, 1972

Type species
- P. pennatus Brignoli, 1972

Species
- 7, see text

Synonyms
- Acanthocymbium Ott & Lise, 1997; Antronetes Millidge, 1991

Genus of spiders

Pseudotyphistes is a genus of South American sheet weavers that was first described by Paolo Marcello Brignoli in 1972.

== Species ==
As of May 2019 it contains seven species, found in Uruguay, Argentina, Peru, and Brazil:

- Pseudotyphistes biriva Rodrigues & Ott, 2007 – Brazil
- Pseudotyphistes cambara (Ott & Lise, 1997) – Brazil
- Pseudotyphistes cristatus (Ott & Lise, 1997) – Brazil
- Pseudotyphistes ludibundus (Keyserling, 1886) – Peru
- Pseudotyphistes pallidus (Millidge, 1991) – Argentina
- Pseudotyphistes pennatus Brignoli, 1972 (type) – Uruguay
- Pseudotyphistes vulpiscaudatus (Ott & Lise, 1997) – Brazil
