= Falcileptoneta hwanseonensis =

Scientific classification
- Domain: Eukaryota
- Kingdom: Animalia
- Phylum: Arthropoda
- Subphylum: Chelicerata
- Class: Arachnida
- Order: Araneae
- Infraorder: Araneomorphae
- Family: Leptonetidae
- Genus: Falcileptoneta
- Species: F. hwanseonensis

Binomial name
- Falcileptoneta hwanseonensis (Namkung, 1987)

Synonyms
- Leptoneta hwanseonensis Namkung, 1987

Species of spider

Falcileptoneta hwanseonensis is a species of spider in the family Leptonetidae.

It was first described by Joon Namkung in 1987 as Leptoneta hwanseonensis, but in 2015, Bo Keun Seo transferred it to the genus Falcileptoneta.

It is a cave-dwelling species and was named after Hwanseon Cave in Gangwon-do where the type specimens were collected.

The species is endemic to Korea.
