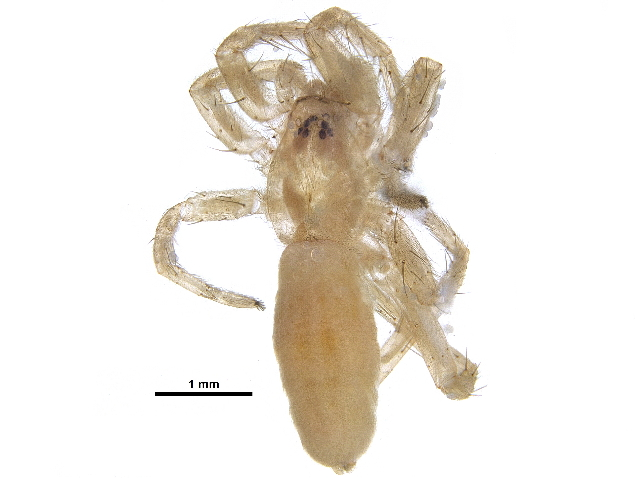
- A. cubana, immature

Scientific classification
- Kingdom: Animalia
- Phylum: Arthropoda
- Subphylum: Chelicerata
- Class: Arachnida
- Order: Araneae
- Infraorder: Araneomorphae
- Family: Anyphaenidae
- Genus: Arachosia; O. Pickard-Cambridge, 1882

Type species
- A. anyphaenoides O. Pickard-Cambridge, 1882

Species
- 21, see text

Synonyms
- Abuzaida Keyserling, 1891; Gayennina Gertsch, 1935; Samuza Keyserling, 1891

= Arachosia (spider) =

Genus of spiders

Arachosia is a genus of anyphaenid sac spiders that was first described by Octavius Pickard-Cambridge in 1882.

== Species ==
As of October 2026 it contains twenty-one species, found in the Americas, including the Greater Antilles:

- Arachosia albiventris Mello-Leitão, 1922 – Brazil, Argentina
- Arachosia anyphaenoides O. Pickard-Cambridge, 1882 (type) – Brazil
- Arachosia arachosia Mello-Leitão, 1922 – Venezuela, Brazil
- Arachosia avalosi Rubio & Ramírez, 2015 – Brazil, Argentina
- Arachosia bergi (Simon, 1880) – Brazil, Uruguay, Argentina
- Arachosia bifasciata (Mello-Leitão, 1922) – Brazil, Argentina
- Arachosia carancho Rubio & Ramírez, 2015 – Argentina
- Arachosia cubana (Banks, 1909) – USA, Cuba
- Arachosia freiburgensis Keyserling, 1891 – Brazil, Argentina
- Arachosia honesta Keyserling, 1891 – Brazil, Argentina
- Arachosia kapiipeoi Rubio & Ramírez, 2015 – Venezuela, Brazil, Ecuador, Peru, Bolivia, Chile, Argentina
- Arachosia magna Rubio & Ramírez, 2015 – Brazil, Argentina
- Arachosia minensis (Mello-Leitão, 1926) – Brazil, Argentina
- Arachosia monserrate Rubio & Ramírez, 2015 – Colombia
- Arachosia oblonga (Keyserling, 1878) – Mexico
- Arachosia pinhalito Rubio & Ramírez, 2015 – Argentina
- Arachosia praesignis (Keyserling, 1891) – Brazil, Argentina
- Arachosia proseni (Mello-Leitão, 1944) – Brazil, Argentina, Uruguay
- Arachosia puta O. Pickard-Cambridge, 1892 – Panama, Brazil
- Arachosia striata (Keyserling, 1891) – Brazil
- Arachosia tungurahua Rubio & Ramírez, 2015 – Ecuador
