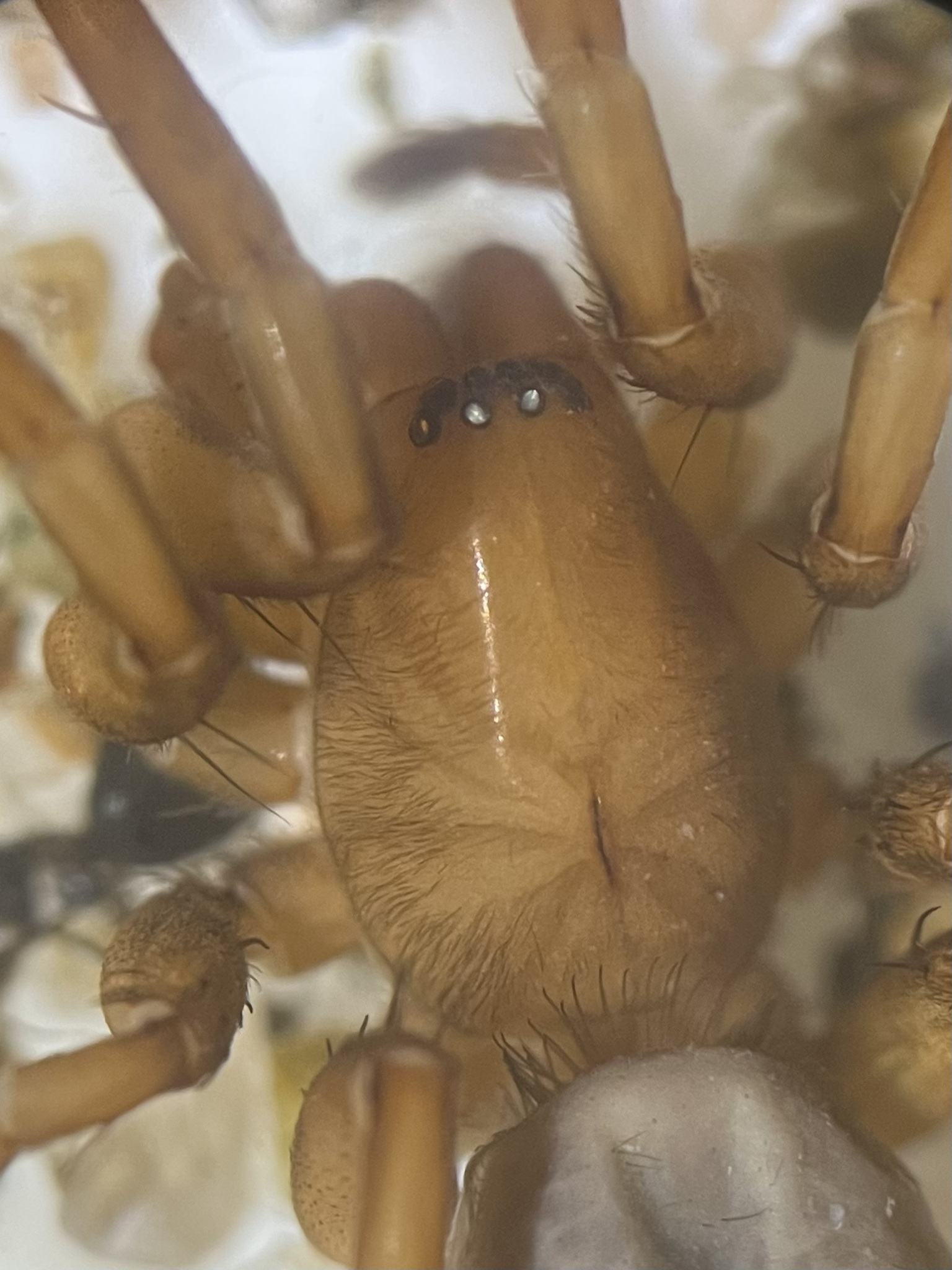
- Cephalothorax of Talanites echinus

Scientific classification
- Kingdom: Animalia
- Phylum: Arthropoda
- Subphylum: Chelicerata
- Class: Arachnida
- Order: Araneae
- Infraorder: Araneomorphae
- Family: Gnaphosidae
- Genus: Talanites; Simon, 1893

Type species
- T. fervidus Simon, 1893

Species
- 15, see text

Synonyms
- Drassyllochemmis Gertsch & Davis, 1936; Rachodrassus Chamberlin, 1922

= Talanites =

Genus of spiders

Talanites is a genus of ground spiders that was first described by Eugène Simon in 1893.

== Species ==
As of May 2019 it contains fifteen species:

- Talanites atscharicus Mcheidze, 1946 – Georgia, Kazakhstan
- Talanites captiosus (Gertsch & Davis, 1936) – Southern Texas, Mexico
- Talanites cavernicola Thorell, 1897 – Myanmar
- Talanites dunini Platnick & Ovtsharenko, 1991 – Israel, Central Asia
- Talanites echinus (Chamberlin, 1922) – Southeastern United States
- Talanites exlineae (Platnick & Shadab, 1976) – Southeastern United States
- Talanites fagei Spassky, 1938 – Azerbaijan, Russia (Europe) to Central Asia
- Talanites fervidus Simon, 1893 (type) – Egypt, Israel
- Talanites mikhailovi Platnick & Ovtsharenko, 1991 – Kazakhstan
- Talanites moodyae Platnick & Ovtsharenko, 1991 – California
- Talanites ornatus (O. Pickard-Cambridge, 1874) – Egypt
- Talanites santschii Dalmas, 1918 – Tunisia
- Talanites strandi Spassky, 1940 – Ukraine, Russia (Europe), Kazakhstan
- Talanites tibialis Caporiacco, 1934 – India, Pakistan
- Talanites ubicki Platnick & Ovtsharenko, 1991 – California
