= Darkoneta =

Scientific classification
- Kingdom: Animalia
- Phylum: Arthropoda
- Subphylum: Chelicerata
- Class: Arachnida
- Order: Araneae
- Infraorder: Araneomorphae
- Family: Archoleptonetidae
- Genus: Darkoneta; Ledford & Griswold, 2010

Type species
- D. stridulans (Platnick, 1994)

Species
- 6, see text

Genus of spiders

Darkoneta is a genus of spiders that was first described by J. M. Ledford & C. E. Griswold in 2010.

== Species ==
As of May 2019 it contains six species:

- Darkoneta arganoi (Brignoli, 1974) – Mexico
- Darkoneta garza (Gertsch, 1974) – USA
- Darkoneta obscura (Gertsch, 1974) – Mexico
- Darkoneta quetzal Ledford & Griswold, 2010 – Guatemala
- Darkoneta reddelli Ledford & Griswold, 2010 – Mexico
- Darkoneta stridulans (Platnick, 1994) (type) – Panama
