= Dasumia =

Scientific classification
- Kingdom: Animalia
- Phylum: Arthropoda
- Subphylum: Chelicerata
- Class: Arachnida
- Order: Araneae
- Infraorder: Araneomorphae
- Family: Dysderidae
- Genus: Dasumia; Thorell, 1875

Type species
- D. laevigata (Thorell, 1873)

Species
- 14, see text

Genus of spiders

Dasumia is a genus of woodlouse hunting spiders that was first described by Tamerlan Thorell in 1875.

== Species ==
As of January 2026, it contained 16 species:

- Dasumia amoena (Kulczyński, 1897) – Eastern Europe, Russia (Caucasus)
- Dasumia antalyaensis Kunt & Özkütük, 2023 – Turkey
- Dasumia canestrinii (L. Koch, 1876) – Southern Europe
- Dasumia capacii Kunt & Özkütük, 2023 – Turkey
- Dasumia carpatica (Kulczyński, 1882) – Eastern Europe
- Dasumia cephalleniae Brignoli, 1976 – Greece
- Dasumia chyzeri (Kulczyński, 1906) – Eastern Europe
- Dasumia crassipalpis (Simon, 1882) – Syria, Israel
- Dasumia diomedea Caporiacco, 1947 – Italy
- Dasumia gasparoi Kunt, Özkütük & Elverici, 2011 – Turkey
- Dasumia kusceri (Kratochvíl, 1935) – Bulgaria, North Macedonia
- Dasumia laevigata (Thorell, 1873) – Europe
- Dasumia mariandyna Brignoli, 1979 – Turkey
- Dasumia nativitatis Brignoli, 1974 – Greece
- Dasumia taeniifera Thorell, 1875 (type) – France, Switzerland, Italy
- Dasumia yagmuri Kunt & Özkütük, 2023 – Turkey

Formerly placed here

- Dasumia sancticedri Brignoli, 1978 = Dysdera sancticedri (Brignoli, 1978)
