= Rhyssoleptoneta latitarsa =

Scientific classification
- Kingdom: Animalia
- Phylum: Arthropoda
- Subphylum: Chelicerata
- Class: Arachnida
- Order: Araneae
- Infraorder: Araneomorphae
- Family: Leptonetidae
- Genus: Rhyssoleptoneta
- Species: R. latitarsa

Binomial name
- Rhyssoleptoneta latitarsa Tong & Li, 2007

Species of spider

Rhyssoleptoneta latitarsa is a species of spider in the family Leptonetidae, found in China.
