= Ozarkia =

Scientific classification
- Kingdom: Animalia
- Phylum: Arthropoda
- Subphylum: Chelicerata
- Class: Arachnida
- Order: Araneae
- Infraorder: Araneomorphae
- Family: Leptonetidae
- Genus: Ozarkia; Ledford & Griswold, 2011

Type species
- O. alabama (Gertsch, 1974)

Species
- 9, see text

Genus of spiders

Ozarkia is a genus of North American leptonetids that was first described by J. Ledford in 2011.

== Species ==
As of May 2019 it contains nine species, all found in the United States:

- Ozarkia alabama (Gertsch, 1974) (type) – USA
- Ozarkia apachea (Gertsch, 1974) – USA
- Ozarkia archeri (Gertsch, 1974) – USA
- Ozarkia arkansa (Gertsch, 1974) – USA
- Ozarkia blanda (Gertsch, 1974) – USA
- Ozarkia georgia (Gertsch, 1974) – USA
- Ozarkia iviei (Gertsch, 1974) – USA
- Ozarkia novaegalleciae (Brignoli, 1979) – USA
- Ozarkia serena (Gertsch, 1974) – USA
