= Yueleptoneta =

Scientific classification
- Kingdom: Animalia
- Phylum: Arthropoda
- Subphylum: Chelicerata
- Class: Arachnida
- Order: Araneae
- Infraorder: Araneomorphae
- Family: Leptonetidae
- Genus: Yueleptoneta; Tong, 2022
- Species: Y. dongxing

Binomial name
- Yueleptoneta dongxing Yang, Tong & Bian, 2022

Species of spider

Yueleptoneta is a monotypic genus of spiders in the family Leptonetidae containing the single species, Yueleptoneta dongxing.

== Distribution ==
Yueleptoneta dongxing is endemic to Guangdong Province of China.

== Etymology ==
The genus name is a combination of 粤; yuè, the abbreviation for Guangdong Province, and related genus Leptoneta.

The species is named after the type locality, Dongxing Village (东兴; Dōngxìng) in Heyuan City, Guangdong Province.

== Taxonomy ==
Yueleptoneta is distinct from the other genera in the chelicerae having the stridulatory file on the lateral margin and the male palp having a tarsal spur, lacking strong spines or apophyses on the femur and tibia.
