= Protoleptoneta =

Scientific classification
- Kingdom: Animalia
- Phylum: Arthropoda
- Subphylum: Chelicerata
- Class: Arachnida
- Order: Araneae
- Infraorder: Araneomorphae
- Family: Leptonetidae
- Genus: Protoleptoneta; Deltshev, 1972

Type species
- P. bulgarica Deltshev, 1972

Species
- 4, see text

Genus of spiders

Protoleptoneta is a genus of leptonetids that was first described by C. Deltshev in 1972.

== Species ==
As of May 2019 it contains four species:

- Protoleptoneta baccettii (Brignoli, 1979) – Italy
- Protoleptoneta beroni Deltshev, 1977 – Bulgaria
- Protoleptoneta bulgarica Deltshev, 1972 (type) – Bulgaria
- Protoleptoneta italica (Simon, 1907) – France, Italy, Austria
