= Talanites echinus =

Scientific classification
- Domain: Eukaryota
- Kingdom: Animalia
- Phylum: Arthropoda
- Subphylum: Chelicerata
- Class: Arachnida
- Order: Araneae
- Infraorder: Araneomorphae
- Family: Gnaphosidae
- Genus: Talanites
- Species: T. echinus

Binomial name
- Talanites echinus (Chamberlin, 1922)

Species of spider

Talanites echinus is a species of ground spider in the family Gnaphosidae. It is found in the United States.
