= Dasumia chyzeri =

Scientific classification
- Kingdom: Animalia
- Phylum: Arthropoda
- Subphylum: Chelicerata
- Class: Arachnida
- Order: Araneae
- Infraorder: Araneomorphae
- Family: Dysderidae
- Genus: Dasumia
- Species: D. chyzeri

Binomial name
- Dasumia chyzeri (Kulczynski, 1906)

Species of spider

Dasumia chyzeri is a spider species from Eastern Europe.
