= Barusia hofferi =

Scientific classification
- Kingdom: Animalia
- Phylum: Arthropoda
- Subphylum: Chelicerata
- Class: Arachnida
- Order: Araneae
- Infraorder: Araneomorphae
- Family: Leptonetidae
- Genus: Barusia
- Species: B. hofferi

Binomial name
- Barusia hofferi (Kratochvíl, 1935)

Synonyms
- Paraleptoneta hofferi Kratochvíl, 1935

Species of spider

Barusia hofferi is a species of spider in the family Leptonetidae. It is found in Montenegro.

== Distribution ==
This species is endemic to southwestern Montenegro. It is so far known only from the type locality, the cave "Pećina kod Blagojevića" near Crkvice in the Krivošije area.
