= Sulcia =

Scientific classification
- Kingdom: Animalia
- Phylum: Arthropoda
- Subphylum: Chelicerata
- Class: Arachnida
- Order: Araneae
- Infraorder: Araneomorphae
- Family: Leptonetidae
- Genus: Sulcia; Kratochvíl, 1938

Type species
- S. nocturna Kratochvíl, 1938

Species
- 8, see text

Genus of spiders

Sulcia is a genus of Balkan leptonetids that was first described by J. Kratochvíl in 1938.

== Species ==
As of May 2019 it contains eight species and two subspecies:

- Sulcia armata Kratochvíl, 1978 – Montenegro
- Sulcia cretica Fage, 1945 – Greece (Crete)
  - Sulcia c. lindbergi Dresco, 1962 – Albania, Greece
  - Sulcia c. violacea Brignoli, 1974 – Greece
- Sulcia inferna Kratochvíl, 1938 – Croatia
- Sulcia mirabilis Kratochvíl, 1938 – Montenegro
- Sulcia montenegrina (Kratochvíl & Miller, 1939) – Montenegro
- Sulcia nocturna Kratochvíl, 1938 (type) – Croatia
- Sulcia occulta Kratochvíl, 1938 – Bosnia-Hercegovina, Serbia
- Sulcia orientalis (Kulczyński, 1914) – Bosnia-Hercegovina
