= Cataleptoneta =

Scientific classification
- Kingdom: Animalia
- Phylum: Arthropoda
- Subphylum: Chelicerata
- Class: Arachnida
- Order: Araneae
- Infraorder: Araneomorphae
- Family: Leptonetidae
- Genus: Cataleptoneta; Denis, 1955

Type species
- C. edentula Denis, 1955

Species
- 7, see text

Genus of spiders

Cataleptoneta is a genus of leptonetids that was first described by J. Denis in 1955.

== Species ==
As of May 2019 it contains seven species:

- Cataleptoneta aesculapii (Brignoli, 1968) – Turkey
- Cataleptoneta detriticola Deltshev & Li, 2013 – Bulgaria, Greece
- Cataleptoneta edentula Denis, 1955 (type) – Lebanon, Israel
- Cataleptoneta lingulata Wang & Li, 2010 – Croatia
- Cataleptoneta sbordonii (Brignoli, 1968) – Turkey
- Cataleptoneta semipinnata Wang & Li, 2010 – Greece
- Cataleptoneta sengleti (Brignoli, 1974) – Greece (Crete)
