= Leptoneta paikmyeonggulensis =

Scientific classification
- Kingdom: Animalia
- Phylum: Arthropoda
- Subphylum: Chelicerata
- Class: Arachnida
- Order: Araneae
- Infraorder: Araneomorphae
- Family: Leptonetidae
- Genus: Leptoneta
- Species: L. paikmyeonggulensis

Binomial name
- Leptoneta paikmyeonggulensis Paik & Seo, 1984

Species of spider

Leptoneta paikmyeonggulensis is a species of leptonetid that was first described by Paik & Bo Keun Seo in 1984.

It is endemic to the Korean Peninsula, where it is found only in caves.
