= Chisoneta =

Scientific classification
- Kingdom: Animalia
- Phylum: Arthropoda
- Subphylum: Chelicerata
- Class: Arachnida
- Order: Araneae
- Infraorder: Araneomorphae
- Family: Leptonetidae
- Genus: Chisoneta; Ledford & Griswold, 2011

Type species
- C. isolata (Gertsch, 1971)

Species
- 4, see text

Genus of spiders

Chisoneta is a genus of North American Leptonetids that was first described by J. Ledford in 2011.

== Species ==
As of May 2019 it contains four species:

- Chisoneta chisosea (Gertsch, 1974) – USA
- Chisoneta isolata (Gertsch, 1971) (type) – Mexico
- Chisoneta modica (Gertsch, 1974) – Mexico
- Chisoneta pecki (Gertsch, 1971) – Mexico
