= Dasumia carpatica =

Scientific classification
- Kingdom: Animalia
- Phylum: Arthropoda
- Subphylum: Chelicerata
- Class: Arachnida
- Order: Araneae
- Infraorder: Araneomorphae
- Family: Dysderidae
- Genus: Dasumia
- Species: D. carpatica

Binomial name
- Dasumia carpatica (Kulczynski, 1882)

Species of spider

Dasumia carpatica is a spider species found in Central Europe.
