= Dasumia kusceri =

Scientific classification
- Kingdom: Animalia
- Phylum: Arthropoda
- Subphylum: Chelicerata
- Class: Arachnida
- Order: Araneae
- Infraorder: Araneomorphae
- Family: Dysderidae
- Genus: Dasumia
- Species: D. kusceri

Binomial name
- Dasumia kusceri (Kratochvil, 1935)

Species of spider

Dasumia kusceri is a rare spider species belonging to the family Dysderidae found in Bulgaria and North Macedonia.

First named in 1935, males grow up to 7 mm and females reach about 5.9 mm with a dark reddish-brown body.
