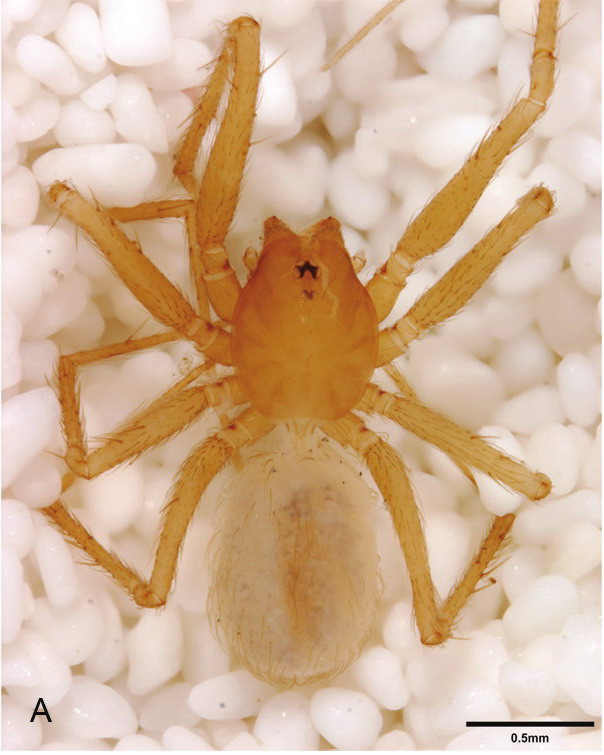
- Tayshaneta bullis

Scientific classification
- Kingdom: Animalia
- Phylum: Arthropoda
- Subphylum: Chelicerata
- Class: Arachnida
- Order: Araneae
- Infraorder: Araneomorphae
- Family: Leptonetidae
- Genus: Tayshaneta; Ledford & Griswold, 2011

Type species
- T. coeca (Chamberlin & Ivie, 1942)

Species
- 19, see text

= Tayshaneta =

Genus of spiders

Tayshaneta is a genus of North American leptonetids that was first described by J. Ledford in 2011.

== Species ==
As of May 2019 it contains nineteen species, all found in the United States:

- Tayshaneta anopica (Gertsch, 1974) – USA
- Tayshaneta archambaulti Ledford, Paquin, Cokendolpher, Campbell & Griswold, 2012 – USA
- Tayshaneta bullis (Cokendolpher, 2004) – USA
- Tayshaneta coeca (Chamberlin & Ivie, 1942) (type) – USA
- Tayshaneta concinna (Gertsch, 1974) – USA
- Tayshaneta devia (Gertsch, 1974) – USA
- Tayshaneta emeraldae Ledford, Paquin, Cokendolpher, Campbell & Griswold, 2012 – USA
- Tayshaneta fawcetti Ledford, Paquin, Cokendolpher, Campbell & Griswold, 2012 – USA
- Tayshaneta grubbsi Ledford, Paquin, Cokendolpher, Campbell & Griswold, 2012 – USA
- Tayshaneta madla Ledford, Paquin, Cokendolpher, Campbell & Griswold, 2012 – USA
- Tayshaneta microps (Gertsch, 1974) – USA
- Tayshaneta myopica (Gertsch, 1974) – USA
- Tayshaneta oconnorae Ledford, Paquin, Cokendolpher, Campbell & Griswold, 2012 – USA
- Tayshaneta paraconcinna (Cokendolpher & Reddell, 2001) – USA
- Tayshaneta sandersi Ledford, Paquin, Cokendolpher, Campbell & Griswold, 2012 – USA
- Tayshaneta sprousei Ledford, Paquin, Cokendolpher, Campbell & Griswold, 2012 – USA
- Tayshaneta valverdae (Gertsch, 1974) – USA
- Tayshaneta vidrio Ledford, Paquin, Cokendolpher, Campbell & Griswold, 2012 – USA
- Tayshaneta whitei Ledford, Paquin, Cokendolpher, Campbell & Griswold, 2012 – USA
