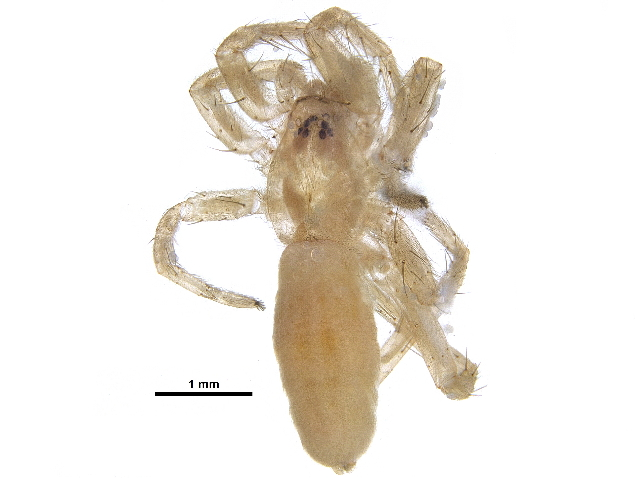

Scientific classification
- Domain: Eukaryota
- Kingdom: Animalia
- Phylum: Arthropoda
- Subphylum: Chelicerata
- Class: Arachnida
- Order: Araneae
- Infraorder: Araneomorphae
- Family: Anyphaenidae
- Genus: Arachosia
- Species: A. cubana

Binomial name
- Arachosia cubana (Banks, 1909)

= Arachosia cubana =

Species of spider

Arachosia cubana is a species of ghost spider in the family Anyphaenidae. It is found in the United States and Cuba.
