= Calileptoneta =

Scientific classification
- Kingdom: Animalia
- Phylum: Arthropoda
- Subphylum: Chelicerata
- Class: Arachnida
- Order: Araneae
- Infraorder: Araneomorphae
- Family: Leptonetidae
- Genus: Calileptoneta; Platnick, 1986

Type species
- C. oasa (Gertsch, 1974)

Species
- 9, see text

Genus of spiders

Calileptoneta is a genus of North American Leptonetids that was first described by Norman I. Platnick in 1986.

== Species ==
As of May 2019 it contains nine species, all found in the United States:

- Calileptoneta briggsi Ledford, 2004 – USA
- Calileptoneta californica (Banks, 1904) – USA
- Calileptoneta cokendolpheri Ledford, 2004 – USA
- Calileptoneta helferi (Gertsch, 1974) – USA
- Calileptoneta noyoana (Gertsch, 1974) – USA
- Calileptoneta oasa (Gertsch, 1974) (type) – USA
- Calileptoneta sylva (Chamberlin & Ivie, 1942) – USA
- Calileptoneta ubicki Ledford, 2004 – USA
- Calileptoneta wapiti (Gertsch, 1974) – USA
