= Dasumia amoena =

Scientific classification
- Kingdom: Animalia
- Phylum: Arthropoda
- Subphylum: Chelicerata
- Class: Arachnida
- Order: Araneae
- Infraorder: Araneomorphae
- Family: Dysderidae
- Genus: Dasumia
- Species: D. amoena

Binomial name
- Dasumia amoena (Kulczynski, 1897)

Species of spider

Dasumia amoena is a spider species found in Eastern Europe and Russia.
