= Sosticus insularis =

Scientific classification
- Domain: Eukaryota
- Kingdom: Animalia
- Phylum: Arthropoda
- Subphylum: Chelicerata
- Class: Arachnida
- Order: Araneae
- Infraorder: Araneomorphae
- Family: Gnaphosidae
- Genus: Sosticus
- Species: S. insularis

Binomial name
- Sosticus insularis (Banks, 1895)

Synonyms
- Prosthesima insularis Banks, 1895; Sosticus continentalis Chamberlin, 1922; Sosticus projectus Fox, 1938

Species of spider

Sosticus insularis is a spider in the family Gnaphosidae ("ground spiders"), in the infraorder Araneomorphae ("true spiders"). The distribution range of Sosticus insularis includes the USA and Canada.
