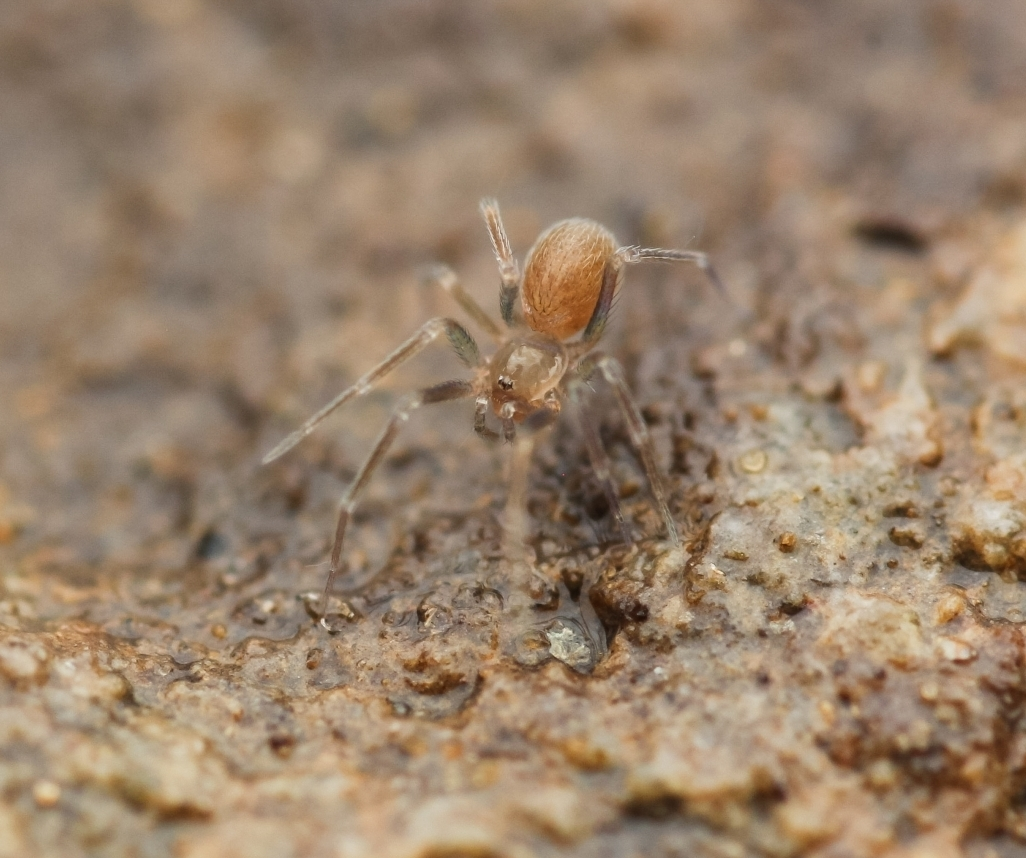
- Archoleptoneta sp. from California

Scientific classification
- Kingdom: Animalia
- Phylum: Arthropoda
- Subphylum: Chelicerata
- Class: Arachnida
- Order: Araneae
- Suborder: Opisthothelae
- Infraorder: Araneomorphae
- Superfamily: Leptonetoidea
- Family: Archoleptonetidae; Gertsch, 1974
- blue: reported countries (WSC)

= Archoleptonetidae =

Family of spiders

Archoleptonetidae is a family of spiders in the order Araneae. There are two genera and eight described species in Archoleptonetidae. They are known from the western USA, southern Mexico, Guatemala, and Panama. This family was formerly a subfamily of Leptonetidae.

== Genera ==
As of January 2026, this family includes two genera and eight species:

- Genus Archoleptoneta Gertsch, 1974
  - Archoleptoneta gertschi Ledford & Griswold, 2010 - United States
  - Archoleptoneta schusteri Gertsch, 1974 - United States
- Genus Darkoneta Ledford & Griswold, 2010
  - Darkoneta arganoi (Brignoli, 1974) - Mexico
  - Darkoneta garza (Gertsch, 1974) - United States
  - Darkoneta obscura (Gertsch, 1974) - Mexico
  - Darkoneta quetzal Ledford & Griswold, 2010 - Guatemala
  - Darkoneta reddelli Ledford & Griswold, 2010 - Mexico
  - Darkoneta stridulans (Platnick, 1994) - Panama
