= Barusia =

Scientific classification
- Kingdom: Animalia
- Phylum: Arthropoda
- Subphylum: Chelicerata
- Class: Arachnida
- Order: Araneae
- Infraorder: Araneomorphae
- Family: Leptonetidae
- Genus: Barusia; Kratochvíl, 1978

Type species
- B. maheni (Kratochvíl & Miller, 1939)

Species
- 5, see text

Genus of spiders

Barusia is a genus of Balkan Leptonetids that was first described by J. Kratochvíl in 1978.

== Species ==
As of May 2019 it contains five species:

- Barusia hofferi (Kratochvíl, 1935) – Montenegro
- Barusia insulana (Kratochvíl & Miller, 1939) – Croatia
- Barusia korculana (Kratochvíl & Miller, 1939) – Croatia
- Barusia laconica (Brignoli, 1974) – Greece
- Barusia maheni (Kratochvíl & Miller, 1939) (type) – Croatia
