= Leptonetela =

Scientific classification
- Kingdom: Animalia
- Phylum: Arthropoda
- Subphylum: Chelicerata
- Class: Arachnida
- Order: Araneae
- Infraorder: Araneomorphae
- Family: Leptonetidae
- Genus: Leptonetela; Kratochvíl, 1978

Type species
- L. kanellisi (Deeleman-Reinhold, 1971)

Species
- 118, see text

Synonyms
- Guineta Lin & Li, 2010; Qianleptoneta Chen & Zhu, 2008; Sinoneta Lin & Li, 2010

Genus of spiders

Leptonetela is a genus of leptonetids that was first described by J. Kratochvíl in 1978.

== Species ==
As of December 2021 it contains 118 species:

- L. andreevi Deltshev, 1985 – Greece
- L. anshun Lin & Li, 2010 – China
- L. arvanitidisi Wang & Li, 2016 – Greece
- L. bama Lin & Li, 2010 – China
- L. biocellata He, Liu, Xu, Yin & Peng, 2019 – China
- L. caucasica Dunin, 1990 – Caucasus (Russia, Georgia, Azerbaijan), Iran?
- L. chakou Wang & Li, 2017 – China
- L. changtu Wang & Li, 2017 – China
- L. chenjia Wang & Li, 2017 – China
- L. chiosensis Wang & Li, 2011 – Greece
- L. chuan Wang & Li, 2017 – China
- L. curvispinosa Lin & Li, 2010 – China
- L. dabian Wang & Li, 2017 – China
- L. danxia Lin & Li, 2010 – China
- L. dao Wang & Li, 2017 – China
- L. dashui Wang & Li, 2017 – China
- L. deltshevi (Brignoli, 1979) – Turkey
- L. digitata Lin & Li, 2010 – China
- L. encun Wang & Li, 2017 – China
- L. erlong Wang & Li, 2017 – China
- L. falcata (Chen, Gao & Zhu, 2000) – China
- L. feilong Wang & Li, 2017 – China
- L. flabellaris Wang & Li, 2011 – China
- L. furcaspina Lin & Li, 2010 – China
- L. gang Wang & Li, 2017 – China
- L. geminispina Lin & Li, 2010 – China
- L. gigachela (Lin & Li, 2010) – China
- L. gittenbergeri Wang & Li, 2011 – Greece
- L. grandispina Lin & Li, 2010 – China
- L. gubin Wang & Li, 2017 – China
- L. hamata Lin & Li, 2010 – China
- L. hangzhouensis (Chen, Shen & Gao, 1984) – China
- L. hexacantha Lin & Li, 2010 – China
- L. huoyan Wang & Li, 2017 – China
- L. identica (Chen, Jia & Wang, 2010) – China
- L. jiahe Wang & Li, 2017 – China
- L. jinsha Lin & Li, 2010 – China
- L. jiulong Lin & Li, 2010 – China
- L. kanellisi (Deeleman-Reinhold, 1971) (type) – Greece
- L. kangsa Wang & Li, 2017 – China
- L. la Wang & Li, 2017 – China
- L. langdong Wang & Li, 2017 – China
- L. latapicalis He, Liu, Xu, Yin & Peng, 2019 – China
- L. liangfeng Wang & Li, 2017 – China
- L. lianhua Wang & Li, 2017 – China
- L. lihu Wang & Li, 2017 – China
- L. lineata Wang & Li, 2011 – China
- L. liping Lin & Li, 2010 – China
- L. liuguan Wang & Li, 2017 – China
- L. liuzhai Wang & Li, 2017 – China
- L. longli Wang & Li, 2017 – China
- L. longyu Wang & Li, 2017 – China
- L. lophacantha (Chen, Jia & Wang, 2010) – China
- L. lujia Wang & Li, 2017 – China
- L. martensi (Zhu & Li, 2021) – China
- L. maxillacostata Lin & Li, 2010 – China
- L. mayang Wang & Li, 2017 – China
- L. megaloda (Chen, Jia & Wang, 2010) – China
- L. meitan Lin & Li, 2010 – China
- L. meiwang Wang & Li, 2017 – China
- L. mengzongensis Wang & Li, 2011 – China
- L. miaoshiensis (Chen & Zhang, 1993) – China
- L. microdonta (Xu & Song, 1983) – China
- L. mita Wang & Li, 2011 – China
- L. nanmu Wang & Li, 2017 – China
- L. niubizi Wang & Li, 2017 – China
- L. notabilis (Lin & Li, 2010) – China
- L. nuda (Chen, Jia & Wang, 2010) – China
- L. oktocantha Lin & Li, 2010 – China
- L. palmata Lin & Li, 2010 – China
- L. panbao Wang & Li, 2017 – China
- L. paragamiani Wang & Li, 2016 – Greece
- L. parlonga Wang & Li, 2011 – China
- L. penevi Wang & Li, 2016 – Greece
- L. pentakis Lin & Li, 2010 – China
- L. pungitia Wang & Li, 2011 – Vietnam
- L. qiangdao Wang & Li, 2017 – China
- L. quinquespinata (Chen & Zhu, 2008) – China
- L. reticulopecta Lin & Li, 2010 – China
- L. robustispina (Chen, Jia & Wang, 2010) – China
- L. rudicula Wang & Li, 2011 – China
- L. rudong Wang & Li, 2017 – China
- L. sanchahe Wang & Li, 2017 – China
- L. sanyan Wang & Li, 2017 – China
- L. sexdentata Wang & Li, 2011 – China
- L. sexdigiti (Lin & Li, 2010) – China
- L. shanji Wang & Li, 2017 – China
- L. shibingensis Guo, Yu & Chen, 2016 – China
- L. shicheng Wang & Li, 2017 – China
- L. shuang Wang & Li, 2017 – China
- L. shuilian Wang & Li, 2017 – China
- L. strinatii (Brignoli, 1976) – Greece
- L. suae Lin & Li, 2010 – China
- L. taixu (Zhu & Li, 2021) – China
- L. tangi He, Liu, Xu, Yin & Peng, 2019 – China
- L. tawo Wang & Li, 2017 – China
- L. tetracantha Lin & Li, 2010 – China
- L. thracia Gasparo, 2005 – Greece
- L. tiankeng Wang & Li, 2017 – China
- L. tianxinensis (Tong & Li, 2008) – China
- L. tianxingensis Wang & Li, 2011 – China
- L. tongzi Lin & Li, 2010 – China
- L. trispinosa (Yin, Wang & Wang, 1984) – China
- L. turcica (Danışman & Coşar, 2021) – Turkey
- L. unispinosa (Yin, Wang & Wang, 1984) – China
- L. wangjia Wang & Li, 2017 – China
- L. wenzhu Wang & Li, 2017 – China
- L. wuming Wang & Li, 2017 – China
- L. xianren Wang & Li, 2017 – China
- L. xianwu (Zhu & Li, 2021) – China
- L. xiaoyan Wang & Li, 2017 – China
- L. xinglong (Zhu & Li, 2021) – China
- L. xinhua Wang & Li, 2017 – China
- L. xui (Chen, Gao & Zhu, 2000) — China
- L. yangi Lin & Li, 2010 – China
- L. yaoi Wang & Li, 2011 – China
- L. zakou Wang & Li, 2017 – China
- L. zhai Wang & Li, 2011 – China
