= Montanineta =

Scientific classification
- Kingdom: Animalia
- Phylum: Arthropoda
- Subphylum: Chelicerata
- Class: Arachnida
- Order: Araneae
- Infraorder: Araneomorphae
- Family: Leptonetidae
- Genus: Montanineta; Ledford & Griswold, 2011
- Species: M. sandra

Binomial name
- Montanineta sandra (Gertsch, 1974)

Genus of spiders

Montanineta is a monotypic genus of North American leptonetid spiders containing the single species, Montanineta sandra. It was first described by J. Ledford in 2011, and has only been found in the United States.
