= Dasumia diomedea =

Scientific classification
- Kingdom: Animalia
- Phylum: Arthropoda
- Subphylum: Chelicerata
- Class: Arachnida
- Order: Araneae
- Infraorder: Araneomorphae
- Family: Dysderidae
- Genus: Dasumia
- Species: D. diomedea

Binomial name
- Dasumia diomedea Caporiacco, 1947

Species of spider

Dasumia diomedea is a spider species found in Italy.
