= Dasumia laevigata =

Scientific classification
- Kingdom: Animalia
- Phylum: Arthropoda
- Subphylum: Chelicerata
- Class: Arachnida
- Order: Araneae
- Infraorder: Araneomorphae
- Family: Dysderidae
- Genus: Dasumia
- Species: D. laevigata

Binomial name
- Dasumia laevigata (Thorell, 1873)

Species of spider

Dasumia laevigata is a spider species from Europe.
