= Appaleptoneta =

Scientific classification
- Kingdom: Animalia
- Phylum: Arthropoda
- Subphylum: Chelicerata
- Class: Arachnida
- Order: Araneae
- Infraorder: Araneomorphae
- Family: Leptonetidae
- Genus: Appaleptoneta; Platnick, 1986

Type species
- A. silvicultrix (Crosby & Bishop, 1925)

Species
- 7, see text

Genus of spiders

Appaleptoneta is a genus of North American Leptonetids that was first described by Norman I. Platnick in 1986.

== Species ==
As of May 2019 it contains seven species, all found in the United States:

- Appaleptoneta barrowsi (Gertsch, 1974) – USA
- Appaleptoneta coma (Barrows, 1940) – USA
- Appaleptoneta credula (Gertsch, 1974) – USA
- Appaleptoneta fiskei (Gertsch, 1974) – USA
- Appaleptoneta gertschi (Barrows, 1940) – USA
- Appaleptoneta jonesi (Gertsch, 1974) – USA
- Appaleptoneta silvicultrix (Crosby & Bishop, 1925) (type) – USA
