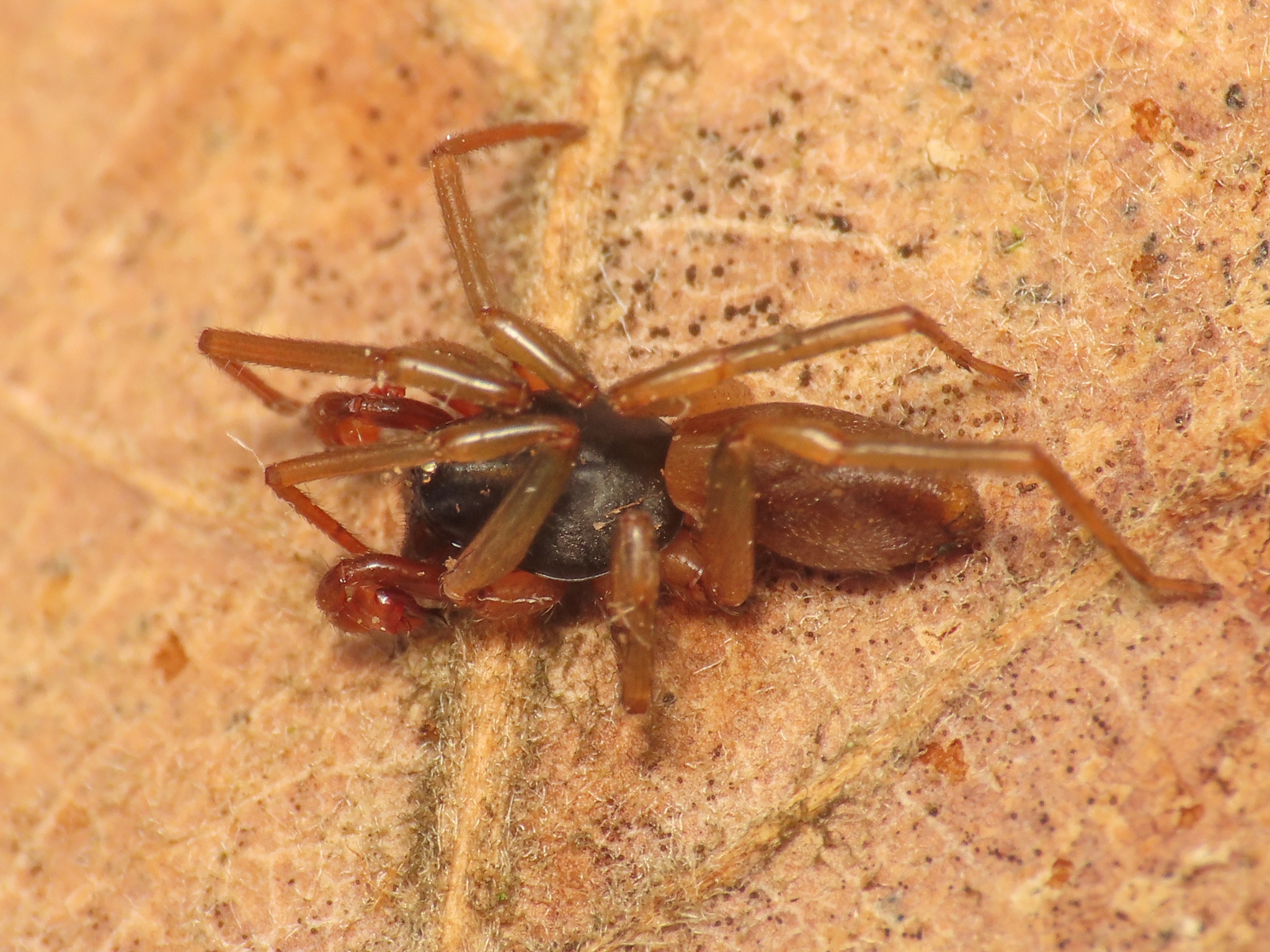

Scientific classification
- Kingdom: Animalia
- Phylum: Arthropoda
- Subphylum: Chelicerata
- Class: Arachnida
- Order: Araneae
- Infraorder: Araneomorphae
- Family: Dysderidae
- Genus: Dasumia
- Species: D. taeniifera

Binomial name
- Dasumia taeniifera Thorell, 1875

Synonyms
- Dysdera scheuchzeri Pavesi, 1875

= Dasumia taeniifera =

Species of spider

Dasumia taeniifera is a spider species found in France, Switzerland and Italy.
