= Jingneta =

Scientific classification
- Kingdom: Animalia
- Phylum: Arthropoda
- Subphylum: Chelicerata
- Class: Arachnida
- Order: Araneae
- Infraorder: Araneomorphae
- Family: Leptonetidae
- Genus: Jingneta; Wang & Li, 2020

Type species
- Leptoneta cornea (Tong & Li, 2008)

Species
- 9, see text

Genus of spiders

Jingneta is a genus of east Asian leptonetids. It was first described by C. X. Wang, S. Q. Li and Ming-Sheng Zhu in 2020, and it has only been found in China. The type species, Jingneta cornea, was originally described under the name "Leptoneta cornea".

== Species ==
As of December 2021 it contains nine species:

- J. caoxian Wang & Li, 2020 – China
- J. cornea (Tong & Li, 2008) (type) – China
- J. exilocula (Tong & Li, 2008) – China
- J. foliiformis (Tong & Li, 2008) – China
- J. jingdong Wang & Li, 2020 – China
- J. maculosa (Song & Xu, 1986) – China
- J. setulifera (Tong & Li, 2008) – China
- J. tunxiensis (Song & Xu, 1986) – China
- J. wangae (Tong & Li, 2008) – China

== See also ==
- Leptoneta
