= Archoleptoneta =

Scientific classification
- Kingdom: Animalia
- Phylum: Arthropoda
- Subphylum: Chelicerata
- Class: Arachnida
- Order: Araneae
- Infraorder: Araneomorphae
- Family: Archoleptonetidae
- Genus: Archoleptoneta; Gertsch, 1974

Type species
- A. schusteri Gertsch, 1974

Species
- A. gertschi Ledford & Griswold, 2010 – USA; A. schusteri Gertsch, 1974 – USA

Genus of spiders

Archoleptoneta is a genus of North American spiders that was first described by Carl Eduard Adolph Gerstaecker in 1974. As of May 2019 it contains only two species, both found in the United States: A. gertschi and A. schusteri.
