= Dasumia nativitatis =

Scientific classification
- Kingdom: Animalia
- Phylum: Arthropoda
- Subphylum: Chelicerata
- Class: Arachnida
- Order: Araneae
- Infraorder: Araneomorphae
- Family: Dysderidae
- Genus: Dasumia
- Species: D. nativitatis

Binomial name
- Dasumia nativitatis Brignoli, 1974

Species of spider

Dasumia nativitatis is a spider species found in Greece.
