= Talanites exlineae =

Scientific classification
- Kingdom: Animalia
- Phylum: Arthropoda
- Subphylum: Chelicerata
- Class: Arachnida
- Order: Araneae
- Infraorder: Araneomorphae
- Family: Gnaphosidae
- Genus: Talanites
- Species: T. exlineae

Binomial name
- Talanites exlineae (Platnick & Shadab, 1976)

Species of spider

Talanites exlineae is a species of ground spider in the family Gnaphosidae. It is found in the United States.
