= Dasumia canestrinii =

Scientific classification
- Kingdom: Animalia
- Phylum: Arthropoda
- Subphylum: Chelicerata
- Class: Arachnida
- Order: Araneae
- Infraorder: Araneomorphae
- Family: Dysderidae
- Genus: Dasumia
- Species: D. canestrinii

Binomial name
- Dasumia canestrinii (L. Koch, 1876)

Species of spider

Dasumia canestrinii is a spider species found in Southern Europe.
