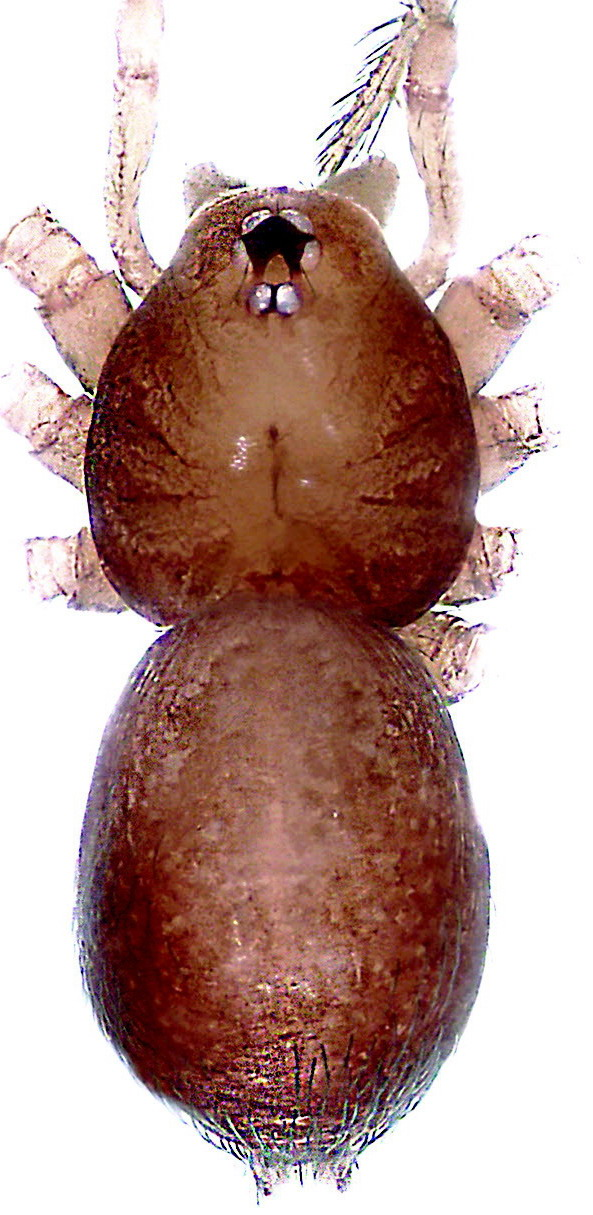

Scientific classification
- Kingdom: Animalia
- Phylum: Arthropoda
- Subphylum: Chelicerata
- Class: Arachnida
- Order: Araneae
- Infraorder: Araneomorphae
- Family: Leptonetidae
- Genus: Falcileptoneta; Komatsu, 1970

Type species
- F. striata (Oi, 1952)

Species
- 49, see text

= Falcileptoneta =

Genus of spiders

Falcileptoneta is a genus of East Asian leptonetids that was first described by T. Komatsu in 1970.

== Species ==
As of July 2019 it contains forty-nine species and one subspecies, found only in Korea and Japan:

- Falcileptoneta aichiensis Irie & Ono, 2007 – Japan
- Falcileptoneta amakusaensis Irie & Ono, 2005 – Japan
- Falcileptoneta asuwana (Nishikawa, 1981) – Japan
- Falcileptoneta baegunsanensis Xu, Kim, Yoo, Nam & Li, 2019 – Korea
- Falcileptoneta bifurca Seo, 2015 – Korea
- Falcileptoneta boeunensis Seo, 2015 – Korea
- Falcileptoneta caeca Yaginuma, 1972 – Japan
- Falcileptoneta chiakensis Seo, 2015 – Korea
- Falcileptoneta coreana (Paik & Namkung, 1969) – Korea
- Falcileptoneta cornuta Seo, 2015 – Korea
- Falcileptoneta digitalis Seo, 2015 – Korea
- Falcileptoneta geumdaensis Seo, 2016 – Korea
- Falcileptoneta geumsanensis Seo, 2016 – Korea
- Falcileptoneta gotoensis Irie & Ono, 2005 – Japan
- Falcileptoneta hansanensis Seo, 2015 – Korea
- Falcileptoneta higoensis (Irie & Ono, 2003) – Japan
- Falcileptoneta hwanseonensis (Namkung, 1987) – Korea
- Falcileptoneta inabensis (Nishikawa, 1982) – Japan
- Falcileptoneta inagakii Irie & Ono, 2011 – Japan
- Falcileptoneta iriei (Komatsu, 1967) – Japan
- Falcileptoneta japonica (Simon, 1893) – Japan
- Falcileptoneta juwangensis Seo, 2015 – Korea
- Falcileptoneta kugoana (Komatsu, 1961) – Japan
- Falcileptoneta maewhaensis Seo, 2016 – Korea
- Falcileptoneta melanocomata (Kishida, 1939) – Japan
- Falcileptoneta moakensis Seo, 2015 – Korea
- Falcileptoneta musculina (Komatsu, 1961) – Japan
- Falcileptoneta naejangenesis Seo, 2015 – Korea
- Falcileptoneta odaesanensis Xu, Kim, Yoo, Nam & Li, 2019 – Korea
- Falcileptoneta ogatai Irie & Ono, 2007 – Japan
- Falcileptoneta okinawaensis Komatsu, 1972 – Japan (Okinawa)
- Falcileptoneta satsumaensis Irie & Ono, 2005 – Japan
- Falcileptoneta secula (Namkung, 1987) – Korea
- Falcileptoneta simboggulensis (Paik, 1971) – Korea
- Falcileptoneta soboensis Irie & Ono, 2005 – Japan
- Falcileptoneta speciosa (Komatsu, 1957) – Japan
- Falcileptoneta striata (Oi, 1952) (type) – Japan
  - Falcileptoneta s. fujisana Yaginuma, 1972 – Japan
- Falcileptoneta sunchangensis Seo, 2016 – Korea
- Falcileptoneta tajimiensis Irie & Ono, 2011 – Japan
- Falcileptoneta tofacea Yaginuma, 1972 – Japan
- Falcileptoneta tsushimensis (Yaginuma, 1970) – Japan
- Falcileptoneta uenoi (Taginuma, 1963) – Japan
- Falcileptoneta umyeonsanensis Xu, Kim, Yoo, Nam & Li, 2019 – Korea
- Falcileptoneta unmunensis Seo, 2015 – Korea
- Falcileptoneta usihanana (Komatsu, 1961) – Japan
- Falcileptoneta yamauchii (Nishikawa, 1982) – Japan
- Falcileptoneta yebongsanensis (Kim, Lee & Namkung, 2004) – Korea
- Falcileptoneta yongdamgulensis (Paik & Namkung, 1969) – Korea
- Falcileptoneta zenjoenis (Komatsu, 1965) – Japan
