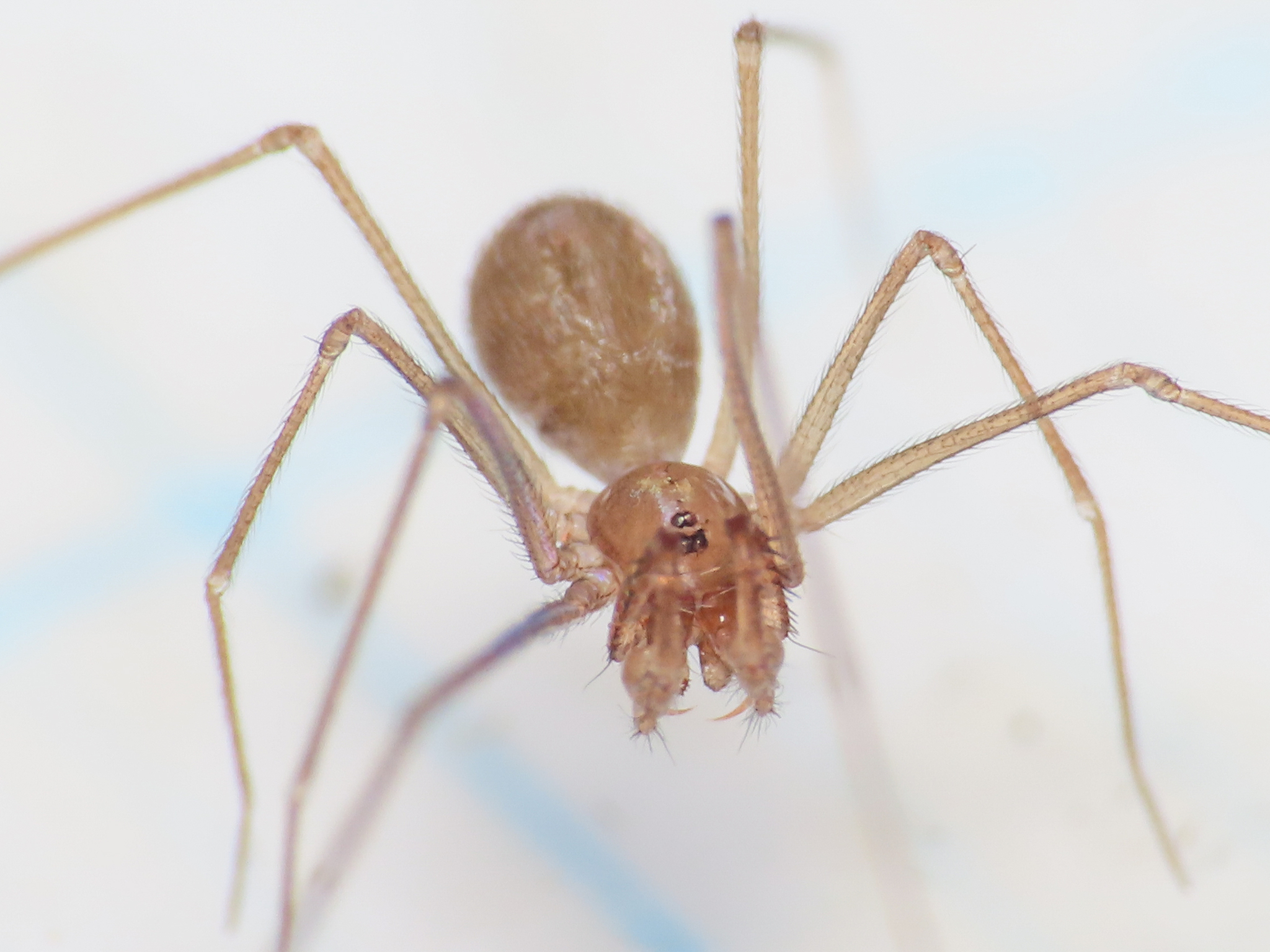
- Paraleptoneta spinimana

Scientific classification
- Kingdom: Animalia
- Phylum: Arthropoda
- Subphylum: Chelicerata
- Class: Arachnida
- Order: Araneae
- Infraorder: Araneomorphae
- Family: Leptonetidae
- Genus: Paraleptoneta; Fage, 1913

Type species
- P. spinimana (Simon, 1884)

Species
- P. bellesi Ribera & Lopez, 1982 – Tunisia; P. spinimana (Simon, 1884) – Algeria, Italy

Synonyms
- Segrea Roewer, 1953

= Paraleptoneta =

Genus of spiders

Paraleptoneta is a genus of leptonetids that was first described by L. Fage in 1913. As of May 2019 it contains only two species: P. bellesi and P. spinimana.
