= Hwanseon Cave =

Cave in South Korea

Hwanseongul
- Location within South Korea
- Interactive map of Hwanseongul
- Location: Gangwon-do (South Korea)
- Coordinates: 37°19′40″N 129°01′30″E
- Length: 6.2 kilometres (3.9 mi)
- Geology: Cambro-Ordovician limestone
- Access: Public tour
- Translation: Fairy's cave (?)

Hwanseon Cave (환선굴) is a cave located in Gangwon province, South Korea.

== Description ==
Hwanseon Cave is the longest known limestone cave in Korea, with 6.2 kilometres (3.9 mi) of known passages and a total suspected length of 8 kilometres (5.0 mi), 1.6 kilometres (0.99 mi) of which are visited by over 1 million people per year. In 1966 the South Korea government designated this cave and a neighboring cave not open to the public, Gwaneum cave (관음굴), National Monument 178. Hwanseongul was opened to the public in 1997.

Situated in a rugged karst range near the city of Samcheok, the cave's 10-metre (33 ft) tall entrance is a grueling 30 to 45 minute uphill hike from the ticket office, although it is also serviced by a monorail which takes 6 minutes. Once inside, the temperature varies between 10–14 °C (50–57 °F). The walls spout water from innumerable cracks and seeps, which join to make good-sized streams, waterfalls and ten large pools. Some rooms in the cave are vast, 100-metre (330 ft) tall, and bridges have been built across chasms in them. There are speleothems of various shapes, but the high rate of water flow has prevented the building up of many stalagmites or stalactites; flowstones, rimstones, popcorn, pipes and curtains are more abundant. 47 species of wildlife have been recorded in the cave, including the lungless Korean clawed salamander Onychodactylus fischeri, the spider Allomengea coreana, the cave cricket Diestrammena asynamora, the millipedes Epanerchodus kimi and Antrokoreana gracilipes, the moth Apopestes indica, and a species of amphipod in the genus Pseudocrangonyx. Four species are unique to Hwanseon Cave, including the beetle Kurasawatrechus latior.

The cave is open year-round. The self-guided tour costs ₩4000, about $4, and takes about an hour to travel the 1.6 km-long section open to visitors on steel catwalks, not including the 1.3-kilometre (1,400 yd) long, 200-metre (660 ft) climb to and from the entrance.
