= Rhyssoleptoneta =

Scientific classification
- Kingdom: Animalia
- Phylum: Arthropoda
- Subphylum: Chelicerata
- Class: Arachnida
- Order: Araneae
- Infraorder: Araneomorphae
- Family: Leptonetidae
- Genus: Rhyssoleptoneta; Tong & Li, 2007

Species
- See text.

Genus of spiders

Rhyssoleptoneta is a genus of East Asian leptonetids containing 2 species, Rhyssoleptoneta latitarsa and Rhyssoleptoneta aosen. It was first described by Y. F. Tong & S. Q. Li in 2007, and has only been found in China. The male of the type species was first described in 2007, and the female was first described in 2012.

== Species ==
As of January 2023 it contains two species:

- Rhyssoleptoneta aosen Zhu & Li, 2021 — China
- Rhyssoleptoneta latitarsa Tong & Li, 2007 (type) — China
