= Teloleptoneta =

Scientific classification
- Kingdom: Animalia
- Phylum: Arthropoda
- Subphylum: Chelicerata
- Class: Arachnida
- Order: Araneae
- Infraorder: Araneomorphae
- Family: Leptonetidae
- Genus: Teloleptoneta; Ribera, 1988
- Species: T. synthetica

Binomial name
- Teloleptoneta synthetica (Machado, 1951)

Genus of spiders

Teloleptoneta is a monotypic genus of European leptonetids containing the single species, Teloleptoneta synthetica. It was first described by C. Ribera in 1988, and has only been found in Portugal.
