= Neoleptoneta =

Scientific classification
- Kingdom: Animalia
- Phylum: Arthropoda
- Subphylum: Chelicerata
- Class: Arachnida
- Order: Araneae
- Infraorder: Araneomorphae
- Family: Leptonetidae
- Genus: Neoleptoneta; Brignoli, 1972

Type species
- Leptoneta capilla Gertsch, 1971

Species
- 8, see text

Genus of spiders

Neoleptoneta is a genus of North American leptonetids that was first described by Paolo Marcello Brignoli in 1972.

== Species ==
As of May 2019 it contains eight species, all found in Mexico:

- Neoleptoneta bonita (Gertsch, 1974) – Mexico
- Neoleptoneta brunnea (Gertsch, 1974) – Mexico
- Neoleptoneta caliginosa Brignoli, 1977 – Mexico
- Neoleptoneta capilla (Gertsch, 1971) (type) – Mexico
- Neoleptoneta delicata (Gertsch, 1971) – Mexico
- Neoleptoneta limpida (Gertsch, 1974) – Mexico
- Neoleptoneta rainesi (Gertsch, 1971) – Mexico
- Neoleptoneta reclusa (Gertsch, 1971) – Mexico
