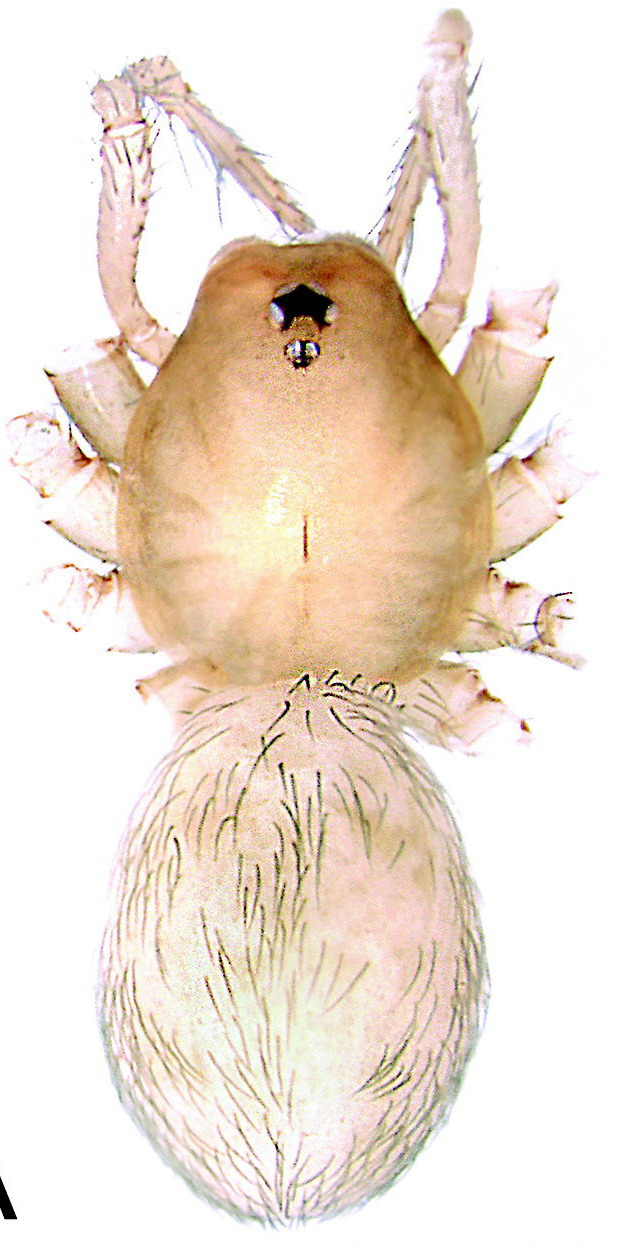
- Longileptoneta jirisan, female

Scientific classification
- Domain: Eukaryota
- Kingdom: Animalia
- Phylum: Arthropoda
- Subphylum: Chelicerata
- Class: Arachnida
- Order: Araneae
- Infraorder: Araneomorphae
- Family: Leptonetidae
- Genus: Longileptoneta; Seo, 2015

Type species
- Longileptoneta songniensis Seo, 2015

Species
- 14, see text

= Longileptoneta =

Genus of spiders

Longileptoneta is a genus of spiders in the family Leptonetidae. It was first described in 2015 by Seo.

== Species ==
As of September 2022 it contains fourteen species, found in Asia:

- Longileptoneta buyongsan Lan, Zhao, Kim, Yoo, Lee & Li, 2021 – Korea
- Longileptoneta byeonsanbando Lan, Zhao, Kim, Yoo, Lee & Li, 2021 – Korea
- Longileptoneta gachangensis Seo, 2016 – Korea
- Longileptoneta gayaensis Seo, 2016 – Korea
- Longileptoneta gutan Wang & Li, 2020 – China
- Longileptoneta huanglongensis (Chen, Zhang & Song, 1982) – China
- Longileptoneta huangshan Wang & Li, 2020 – China
- Longileptoneta jangseongensis Seo, 2016 – Korea
- Longileptoneta jirisan Lan, Zhao, Kim, Yoo, Lee & Li, 2021 – Korea
- Longileptoneta shenxian Wang & Li, 2020 – China
- Longileptoneta songniensis Seo, 2015 (type) – Korea
- Longileptoneta weolakensis Seo, 2016 – Korea
- Longileptoneta yeren Wang & Li, 2020 – China
- Longileptoneta zhuxian Wang & Li, 2020 – China
