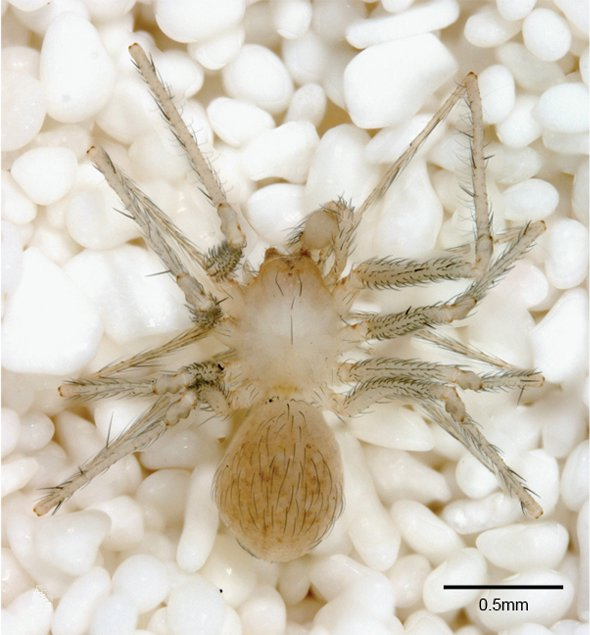
- Tayshaneta anopica

Scientific classification
- Kingdom: Animalia
- Phylum: Arthropoda
- Subphylum: Chelicerata
- Class: Arachnida
- Order: Araneae
- Infraorder: Araneomorphae
- Family: Leptonetidae; Simon, 1890

Diversity
- 22 genera, 400 species
- blue: reported countries (WSC)

= Leptonetidae =

Leptonetids Temporal range: Cretaceous–present

Family of spiders

Leptonetidae is a family of small spiders adapted to live in dark and moist places such as caves. The family is relatively primitive having diverged around the Middle Jurassic period. They were first described by Eugène Simon in 1890.

== Distinguishing characteristics ==
Leptonetids are small, with most falling between 2 and 5 mm (0.1 and 0.2 in) in total length. They are generally pale in color and feature a greenish or bluish shine due to microscopic texture on the cuticle of their exoskeleton. Those species which have retained their eyes, have 6 eyes set in a distinctive pattern, with posterior pair set back from the others. If a spider from this family loses a leg, it usually separates between the patella and tibia rather than at the coxa/trochanter joint.

== Habitat ==
Many live in caves or in leaf litter around the Mediterranean, and in Eurasia, Japan and southern North America.

== Genera ==
As of October 2025, this family includes 22 genera and 400 species:

- Appaleptoneta Platnick, 1986 – United States
- Barusia Kratochvíl, 1978 – Croatia, Greece, Montenegro
- Calileptoneta Platnick, 1986 – United States
- Cataleptoneta Denis, 1955 – Israel, Lebanon, Turkey, Bulgaria, Croatia, Greece
- Chisoneta Ledford & Griswold, 2011 – Mexico, United States
- Falcileptoneta Komatsu, 1970 – Eastern Asia
- Jingneta Wang & Li, 2020 – China
- Leptoneta Simon, 1872 – Algeria, Korea, Italy, Portugal, Spain, France
- Leptonetela Kratochvíl, 1978 – China, Vietnam, Caucasus, Iran?, Turkey, Greece
- Longileptoneta Seo, 2015 – China, Japan, Korea
- Masirana Kishida, 1942 – Japan, Korea, Taiwan
- Montanineta Ledford & Griswold, 2011 – United States
- Neoleptoneta Brignoli, 1972 – Mexico
- Ozarkia Ledford & Griswold, 2011 – United States
- Paraleptoneta Fage, 1913 – Algeria, Tunisia, Italy, France
- Pararana Lin & Li, 2022 – China
- Protoleptoneta Deltshev, 1972 – Austria, Bulgaria, Italy, Slovenia, France
- Rhyssoleptoneta Tong & Li, 2007 – China
- Sulcia Kratochvíl, 1938 – Southern Europe
- Tayshaneta Ledford & Griswold, 2011 – United States
- Teloleptoneta Ribera, 1988 – Portugal
- Yueleptoneta Tong, 2022 – China

Two genera have been moved to the family Archoleptonetidae:

- Archoleptoneta Gertsch, 1974 — United States
- Darkoneta Ledford & Griswold, 2010 — North America, Central America
