= Masirana =

Scientific classification
- Kingdom: Animalia
- Phylum: Arthropoda
- Subphylum: Chelicerata
- Class: Arachnida
- Order: Araneae
- Infraorder: Araneomorphae
- Family: Leptonetidae
- Genus: Masirana; Kishida, 1942

Type species
- M. cinevacea Kishida, 1942

Species
- 23, see text

Synonyms
- Sarutana Komatsu, 1957

Genus of spiders

Masirana is a genus of Asian leptonetids that was first described by T. Komatsu in 1942.

== Species ==
As of May 2019 it contains twenty-three species and three subspecies from Japan, Korea, and Okinawa:

- Masirana abensis (Kobayashi, 1973) – Japan
- Masirana akahanei Komatsu, 1963 – Japan
- Masirana akiyoshiensis (Oi, 1958) – Japan
  - Masirana a. imperatoria Komatsu, 1974 – Japan
  - Masirana a. kagekiyoi Komatsu, 1974 – Japan
  - Masirana a. primocreata Komatsu, 1974 – Japan
- Masirana bandoi (Nishikawa, 1986) – Japan
- Masirana bonghwaensis Seo, 2015 – Korea
- Masirana chibusana (Irie, 2000) – Japan
- Masirana cinevacea Kishida, 1942 (type) – Japan
- Masirana flabelli Seo, 2015 – Korea
- Masirana glabra (Komatsu, 1957) – Japan
- Masirana ilweolensis Seo, 2015 – Korea
- Masirana kawasawai (Komatsu, 1970) – Japan
- Masirana kinoshitai (Irie, 2000) – Japan
- Masirana kosodeensis Komatsu, 1963 – Japan
- Masirana kuramotoi Komatsu, 1974 – Japan
- Masirana kusunoensis Irie & Ono, 2010 – Japan
- Masirana kyokoae Yaginuma, 1972 – Japan
- Masirana longimana Yaginuma, 1970 – Japan
- Masirana longipalpis Komatsu, 1972 – Japan (Okinawa)
- Masirana mizonokuchiensis Irie & Ono, 2005 – Japan
- Masirana nippara Komatsu, 1957 – Japan
- Masirana silvicola (Kobayashi, 1973) – Japan
- Masirana taioensis Irie & Ono, 2005 – Japan
- Masirana taraensis Irie & Ono, 2005 – Japan
