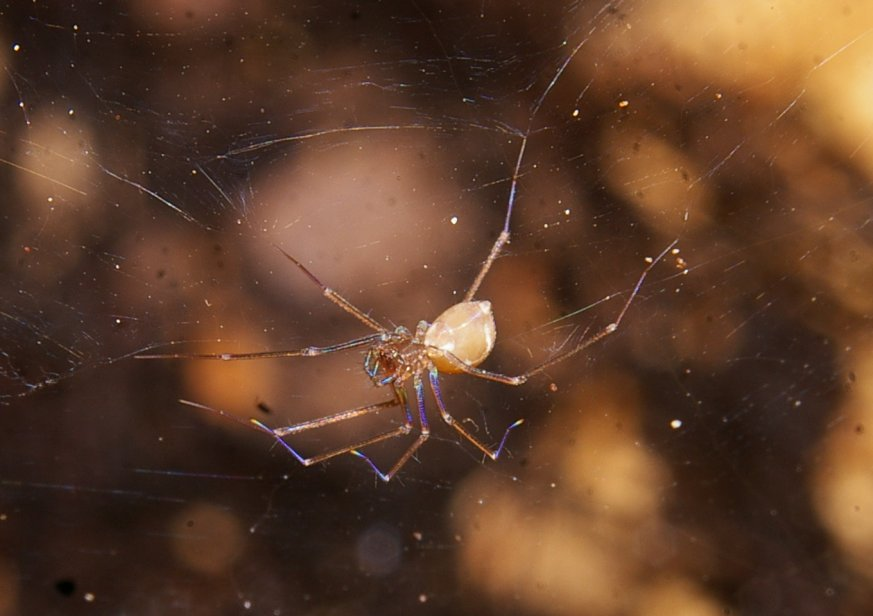
- L. infuscata, female

Scientific classification
- Kingdom: Animalia
- Phylum: Arthropoda
- Subphylum: Chelicerata
- Class: Arachnida
- Order: Araneae
- Infraorder: Araneomorphae
- Family: Leptonetidae
- Genus: Leptoneta; Simon, 1872

Type species
- L. convexa Simon, 1872

Species
- 50, see text

= Leptoneta =

Genus of spiders

Leptoneta is a genus of leptonetids that was first described by Eugène Louis Simon in 1872.

== Species ==
As of January 2023 it contains 50 species:

- L. abeillei Simon, 1882 – Spain, France
- L. albera Simon, 1882 – France
- L. alpica Simon, 1882 – France
- L. berlandi Machado & Ribera, 1986 – Portugal
- L. cavalairensis Dresco, 1987 – France
- L. chilbosanensis Kim, Yoo & Lee, 2016 — Korea
- L. ciaisensis Dresco, 1987 – France
- L. comasi Ribera, 1978 – Spain
- L. condei Dresco, 1987 – France
- L. conimbricensis Machado & Ribera, 1986 – Portugal
- L. convexa Simon, 1872 (type) – France
  - Leptoneta c. aulotensis Dresco, 1990 – France
- L. cornea Tong & Li, 2008 – China
- L. corsica Fage, 1943 – France (Corsica)
- L. crypticola Simon, 1907 – France
  - Leptoneta c. franciscoloi Caporiacco, 1950 – Italy
- L. fagei Simon, 1914 – France
- L. fouresi Dresco, 1979 – France
- L. handeulgulensis Namkung, 2002 – Korea
- L. hogyegulensis Paik & Namkung, 1969 – Korea
- L. hongdoensis Paik, 1980 – Korea
- L. infuscata Simon, 1872 – Spain (mainland, Majorca), France
  - Leptoneta i. ovetana Machado, 1939 – Spain
- L. insularis Roewer, 1953 – Sardinia
- L. jangsanensis Seo, 1989 – Korea
- L. jeanneli Simon, 1907 – France
- L. kernensis Simon, 1910 – Algeria
- L. kwangreungensis Kim, Jung, Kim & Lee, 2004 – Korea
- L. lantosquensis Dresco, 1987 – France
- L. leucophthalma Simon, 1907 – Spain
- L. manca Fage, 1913 – France
- L. miaoshiensis Chen & Zhang, 1993 – China
- L. microphthalma Simon, 1872 – France
- L. naejangsanensis Paik & Seo, 1982 – Korea
- L. namhensis Paik & Seo, 1982 – Korea
- L. namkungi Kim, Jung, Kim & Lee, 2004 – Korea
- L. olivacea Simon, 1882 – France
- L. paikmyeonggulensis Paik & Seo, 1984 – Korea
- L. paroculus Simon, 1907 – Spain
- L. patrizii Roewer, 1953 – Sardinia
- L. proserpina Simon, 1907 – France
- L. seogwipoensis Kim, Ye & Kim, 2015 – Korea
- L. serbariuana Roewer, 1953 – Sardinia
- L. soryongensis Paik & Namkung, 1969 – Korea
- L. spinipalpus Kim, Lee & Namkung, 2004 – Korea
- L. taeguensis Paik, 1985 – Korea
- L. taramellii Roewer, 1956 – Sardinia
- L. trabucensis Simon, 1907 – France
- L. vittata Fage, 1913 – France
- L. waheulgulensis Namkung, 1991 – Korea
- L. yongyeonensis Seo, 1989 – Korea
