= Paolo Brignoli =

Italian entomologist (1942–1986)

Paolo Marcello Brignoli (25 April 1942 – 8 July 1986) was a prominent Italian entomologist. He studied a broad range of arachnid groups, including Araneidae, Acari, Ricinulei, Palpigradi, Schizomida, Opiliones, and Amblypygi. His research mainly focused on evolutionary systematics, taxonomy, and biogeography. Over the course of his career, he described 23 new genera and 367 new species belonging to 33 different arachnid families. The International Society of Arachnology's Brignoli Award is named in his honor.
