= Willis J. Gertsch =

American arachnologist

- Born: October 4, 1906
- Died: December 12, 1998 (aged 92)
- Education: University of Minnesota; University of Utah
- Scientific career
- Fields: Arachnology
- Workplaces: American Museum of Natural History
- Academic advisors: Ralph Vary Chamberlin

Willis John Gertsch (October 4, 1906 – December 12, 1998) was an American arachnologist. He described over 1,000 species of spiders, scorpions, and other arachnids, including the Brown recluse spider and the Tooth cave spider.

Gertsch was born in Montpelier, Idaho, on October 4, 1906. He earned a M.S. from University of Utah in 1930, working under Ralph V. Chamberlin, and in 1935 a PhD from University of Minnesota, although he had by then taken on a job at the American Museum of Natural History, and so earned his doctorate in absentia.

Gertsch was the premier American arachnologist for half of the 20th century. He was Curator of Arachnids at the American Museum of Natural History, and later retired to Portal, Arizona in the Chiricahua Mountains. He was the author of hundreds of generic and specific names in a multitude of families and also the author of American Spiders, as well as editor of a later revised printing of John Henry Comstock's Spider Book. During his tenure as Curator at the American Museum of Natural History he was the usual authority quoted when any question on spiders arose.

Gertsch was consulted by author E. B. White before Charlotte's Web was published to inquire about a spider he observed. Gertsch was the one who informed White that the spider was a barn spider (Araneus cavaticus). The character Charlotte's full name in the book is "Charlotte A. Cavatica."
