= Mariana Wolfner =

American molecular biologist

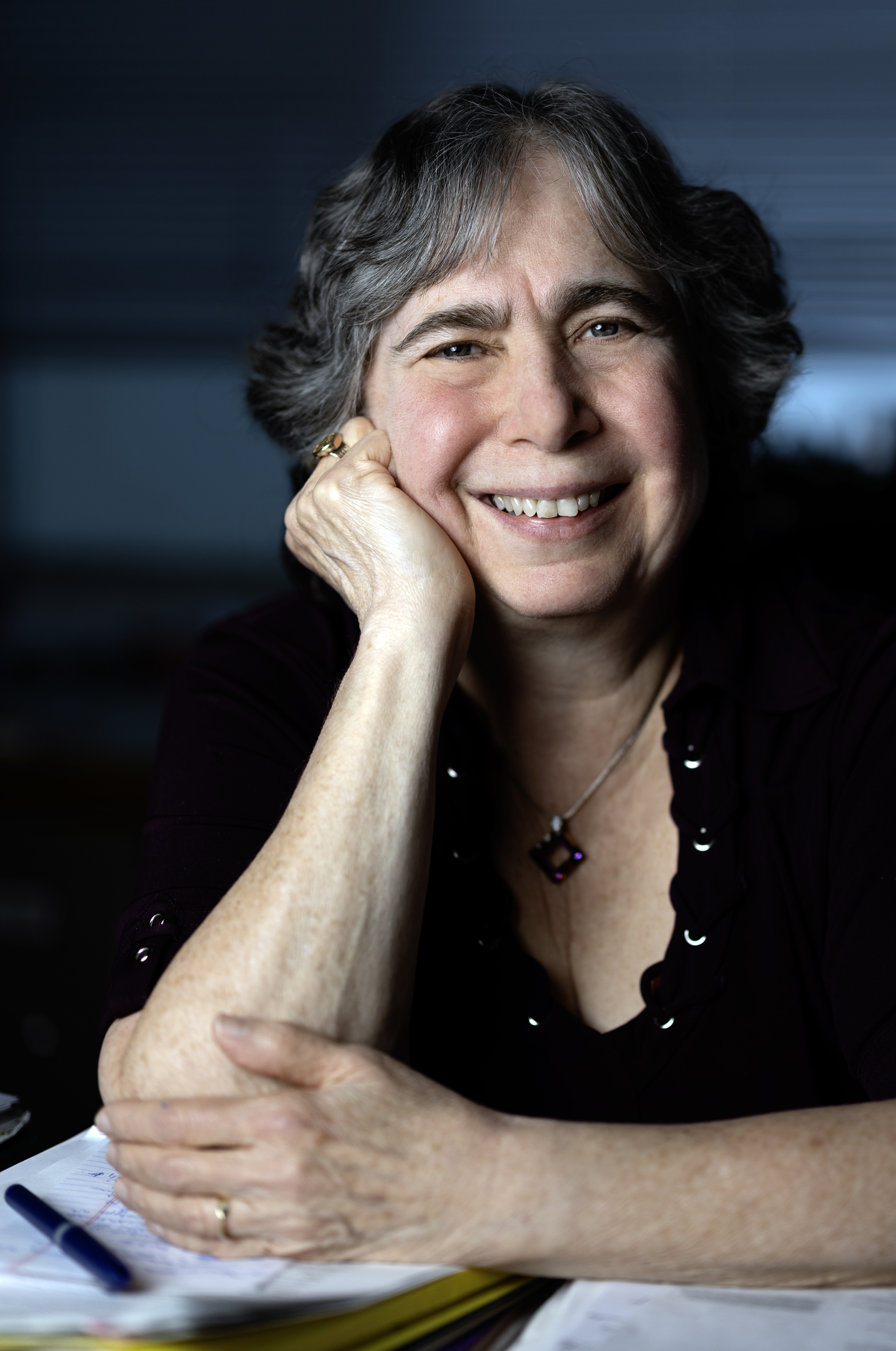
- Wolfner in 2025
- Born: Mariana Federica Wolfner
- Education: Cornell University (BS); Stanford University (PhD)
- Awards: Member of the National Academy of Sciences (2019); Genetics Society of America Medal (2018)
- Scientific career
- Fields: Reproductive biology Drosophila genetics Early embryogenesis Seminal proteins
- Workplaces: Cornell University; University of California, San Diego
- Thesis: Ecdysone-responsive genes of the salivary gland of Drosophila melanogaster (1980)
- Doctoral advisor: David Hogness
- Website: cals.cornell.edu/people/mariana-federica-wolfner

Mariana Federica Wolfner is the Goldwin Smith Professor of molecular biology and genetics at Cornell University. Her research investigates sexual conflict in the fruit fly Drosophila melanogaster. She was elected a member of the National Academy of Sciences (NAS) in 2019 in recognition of her distinguished and continuing achievements in original research.

== Early life and education ==
Wolfner became interested in biology as a child. She decided to study at Cornell University because it was well known for genetics. During her undergraduate degree she worked in Gerald Fink's laboratory, studying the control of amino acids in yeast, and graduated in 1974. She moved to Stanford University for her graduate degree, where she was a doctoral student in the lab of David Hogness. She was one of the first to use recombinant DNA to isolate the genes in Drosophila. Wolfner pioneered the use of cDNA hybridisation to isolate the genes which respond to ecdysone during metamorphosis.

== Research and career ==
Wolfner joined University of California, San Diego for a postdoctoral fellowship under the supervision of Bruce Baker. Here she started to study the genes that are involved in sex determination of Drosophila. With Baker, Wolfner cloned the doublesex gene.

Wolfner joined the faculty at Cornell University in 1983. She has explored the mechanisms that are responsible for sex determination and development in Drosophila. Wolfner has identified over two hundred of the drosophila seminal fluid proteins and their influence on physiology and behaviour. She performed genetic ablation to identify the genes that encoded seminal fluid proteins. She found that female drosophila store semen for a while before fertilisation, and become less interested in males after mating. Wolfner found that during mating the seminal fluid proteins that were created in male accessory glands were transferred to females, and caused postmating changes. She spent two years at the University of California, San Diego working on mutant phenotypes in seminal fluid proteins.

In her extensive studies of the seminal fluid proteins of Drosophila, Wolfner has uncovered new information about sexual conflict. She showed that seminal fluid proteins that increase the egg-laying rate of females are beneficial for males, but can reduce the lifespan of the female drosophila. Apc26Aa is one of the seminal fluid proteins that can cause these postmating changes in female drosophila. She found that seminal fluid proteins can act as switches that activate physiology in the mated females. Wolfner works with Laura Harrington on the identification of seminal fluid proteins in mosquitoes that are responsible for the transmission of the Zika and dengue viruses.

She also works on the egg-to-embryo transition, after the oocyte is released and before it is activated to begin embryogenesis. Wolfner demonstrated that the egg-to-embryo transition is not the same in drosophila and mammals. In drosophila, the oocyte is squeezed into the oviduct, whereas in mammals the sperm triggers the transition. She showed that the activation process in drosophila involves a spike of calcium, which triggers downstream pathways.

She was appointed the Goldwin Smith Professor of Molecular Biology & Genetics in Cornell University in 2013.

== Awards and honours ==
- 2006 Elected a Fellow of the American Association for the Advancement of Science (FAAAS)
- 2012 Cornell University Kendall S. Carpenter Memorial Award for Distinguished Advising
- 2016 Queen's University Al Downe Lecturer
- 2017 Entomological Society of America Recognition Award in Physiology, Biochemistry and Toxicology
- 2018 Genetics Society of America Medal
- 2019 Elected a member of the National Academy of Sciences (NAS)
