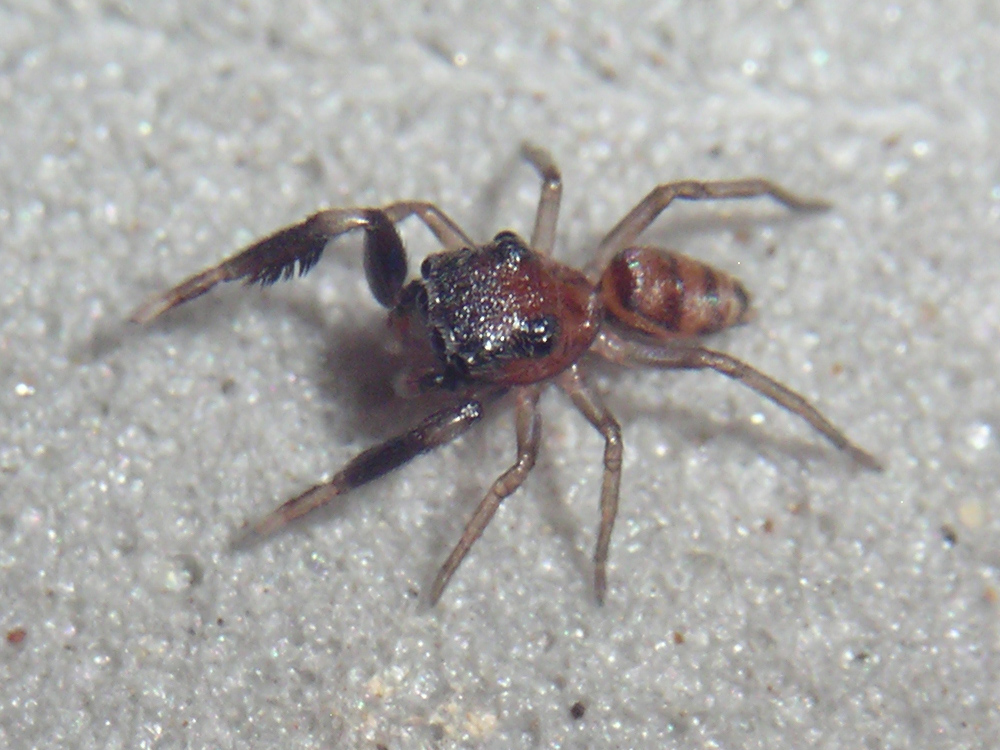
- Male Bristowia sp. in Malaysia

Scientific classification
- Kingdom: Animalia
- Phylum: Arthropoda
- Subphylum: Chelicerata
- Class: Arachnida
- Order: Araneae
- Infraorder: Araneomorphae
- Family: Salticidae
- Subfamily: Salticinae
- Genus: Bristowia; Reimoser, 1934

Species
- See text.

Diversity
- 3 species

= Bristowia =

Genus of spiders

Bristowia is a genus of spiders in the jumping spider family, Salticidae, found in Africa and Asia.

B. heterospinosa is about 3 to 4 mm long in both sexes.

== Name ==
The genus is named after naturalist and arachnologist W. S. Bristowe.

== Species ==
As of April 2017, the World Spider Catalog accepted the following species:

- Bristowia afra Szűts, 2004 — Congo Basin
- Bristowia gandhii Kanesharatnam & Benjamin, 2016 — Sri Lanka
- Bristowia heterospinosa Reimoser, 1934 — India, China, Korea, Vietnam, Japan, Krakatau

== Bibliography ==
- Szűts, T. (2004). "A revision of the genus Bristowia (Araneae: Salticidae)". Folia entomologica hungarica 65: 25-31. PDF
