= Sexual conflict in humans =

Psychological concept

In evolutionary psychology and evolutionary biology, sexual conflict in humans occurs as a result of men and women having diverging reproductive interests, creating tension and competition between the two sexes over mating strategies. Sexual conflict also arises in other species as a result of males and females having different optimal strategies for maximizing their reproductive success. In humans, as well as other species, males tend to seek strategies that increase their number of mating opportunities, while females tend to seek strategies that ensure high investment and quality from their mates.

== Evolutionary basis ==
The foundation of sexual conflict lies in the theory of sexual selection, first articulated by Charles Darwin and later expanded by other evolutionary theorists. Sexual selection suggests that traits evolve not only because they enhance survival but because they increase an individual's chances of reproducing.

In humans, as in many other species, there is a significant disparity in reproductive investment between the sexes. Typically, females invest more heavily due to pregnancy, childbirth, and often childcare, while males can potentially reproduce with minimal investment. This asymmetry gives rise to different reproductive strategies: males may seek to maximize their reproductive success by mating with multiple females, while females may be more selective in choosing mates who can provide resources or high-quality genes.

== Forms of sexual conflict ==
=== Mating strategies ===
Men and women often exhibit different preferences for mating strategies. Research shows that men, on average, prioritize short-term mating opportunities with multiple women. By contrast, women tend to be more selective in their mating choices, favoring long-term commitment with a man who possesses quality genetic and material resources that he is willing to provide. Women tend to favor a mating strategy that consists of delaying sexual intercourse until she can ensure the quality of the potential mate. This conflicts with the masculine strategy of pursuing sexual intercourse with as many women as possible.

=== Sexual overperception and commitment skepticism ===
Sex differences in the interpretation of sexual interest and romantic commitment may contribute to conflict between men and women. This is proposed to be related to error management theory, which suggests that natural selection can favor biased judgments when the reproductive costs of making one type of error have historically exceeded those of making another.

Men may interpret friendliness, smiling, physical contact, or other nonsexual behavior in a woman as evidence of sexual attraction. According to error management theory, this bias may have evolved because failing to recognize a genuine sexual opportunity could impose reproductive costs on ancestral men. Men who pursue short-term mating strategies are more likely to exhibit stronger sexual overperception biases.

Women may underestimate men's romantic commitment during courtship, a phenomenon called commit skepticism. It is hypothesized that this bias may protect women against men who exaggerate emotional involvement to pursue a short-term mating strategy. Women displaying commitment skepticism may require stronger behavioral evidence of a man's devotion before interpreting a man's expressions of romantic affection as exhibiting genuine commitment.

These contrasting biases may create sexual conflict when men perceive sexual interest that women do not intend to communicate or when women remain skeptical of genuine expressions of commitment.

=== Sexual withholding ===
Sexual withholding occurs when partners differ in their preferred timing or frequency of sexual intercourse. This behavior involves delaying intercourse, declining sexual advances, or discontinuing sexual activity after an initial expression of interest.

Women may delay sexual intercourse as a tactic to further evaluate potential partners and their willingness to provide emotional commitment or resources. This interferes with the short-term mating strategies of men pursuing earlier sexual access.

=== Sexual coercion ===
Humans display sexually coercive behaviors similar to those observed in other apes, such as forced copulation, aggressive mate guarding, and controlling a partner's movements. Sexual coercion is more likely to be used by men, often as a strategy for overcoming sexual conflict in existing relationships with women. Humans are unusual for the wide variety of tactics that they use for sexual coercion. Direct coercion tactics used by men including rape, sexual harassment, intimidation, and punishment. Indirect coercion refers to forceful tactics, sometimes referred to as coercive mate guarding, used by men to reduce the likelihood of partner extra-pair copulation. Indirect coercion includes herding, sequestration, and punishment.

Sexual aggression in humans comes most frequently from men who are in an existing social or sexual relationship with the female victim. Among college-aged women, approximately 40% of rape victims continue to have relationships with their attackers. Among married women raped by their partners, most are raped multiple times and a large proportion additionally face physical abuse. Women in developed countries often gain increased economic opportunities that allow them to escape coercive partners, which may threaten the sense of control their partners have over the relationship and thus encourage the use of sexual coercion by their partners. In the United States, Albania, and various developing countries, women with higher education levels and greater personal income experience increased risk of physical abuse from a partner. Women in developed nations with high education levels are more vulnerable to coercive partners, as a result of being more likely to live distantly from close friends and relatives, and being more likely to be isolated from social networks.

=== Sexual deception ===
Studies show that men often admit to misleading women about their emotional commitment. For instance, in a survey of 112 college men, 71 percent confessed to exaggerating their feelings to engage in sexual activity, compared to 39 percent of women. In another study where women recounted their experiences of being deceived by men, they reported various forms of deception: "falsely implying stronger feelings than actually felt" (44 percent), "exaggerating sincerity, trustworthiness, or kindness" (42 percent), "misleading about compatibility" (36 percent), and "pretending to have stronger feelings to have sex" (25 percent). Men with Dark Triad traits—narcissism, Machiavellianism, and psychopathy—are particularly likely to use these deceptive strategies.

=== Romantic jealousy ===
Men tend to display jealousy towards sexual rivals who possess status and resources, while women tend to display jealousy towards sexual rivals who possess physical attractiveness. Women are more likely to intentionally induce jealousy in their mates as a strategy for retaining them. Women intentionally create jealousy in their mates through tactics such as flirting with other men in front of them, showing interest in other men, and talking with other men. Women report that they are motivated to elicit jealousy in their mates to increase the closeness of their relationship, to test the strength of their relationship, to find out whether their partner still cares, and to motivate their partner to be more possessive of them.

=== Mate guarding and resistance to mate guarding ===
Men and women engage in mate guarding as a strategy to retain their mates in existing relationships.

Male mate guarding tactics include resource displays, monitoring a partner's activities, monopolizing her time, and threatening male rivals. In a study of married couples, the youth, physical attractiveness, and perceived likelihood of a woman's infidelity increased the prevalence of mate-guarding tactics used by her male partner. Women, by contrast, used beauty enhancement and verbal signals of love as mate-retention tactics, and their motivations for engaging in mate-guarding were associated with their male partner's income and status.

Male mate guarding may conflict with women's interests when it restricts freedom of movement, social relationships, or opportunities to evaluate alternative mates. Women may respond through resistance strategies designed to circumvent or oppose their partner's attempts at control.

In a study of 1,069 women, six strategies were used for resistance to mate guarding: covert resistance tactics, resistance to public displays of affection, resistance to partner control, reactions against rival confrontation, covert use of communication technology, and avoidance of contact with a partner.

=== Mate poaching ===
Women may sometimes engage in mate poaching, the attempt to attract a male who is already involved in a romantic or sexual relationship. This may interfere with the reproductive interests of a romantically taken woman by tempting her male partner to engage in infidelity. A man who is in an existing relationship displays signals that he has been evaluated by a woman as a desirable romantic partner, possibly enticing mate poaching behavior in other women.

=== Post-breakup sexual conflict ===
Sexual conflict may occur as a result of a romantic relationship ending and one of the former partners disagreeing over whether the relationship should continue. An individual seeking new mating opportunities may encounter resistance from a former partner attempting to restore the relationship.

Tactics for regaining access to former partners include stalking, harassing potential rivals, and interfering with a former partner's opportunities to establish a new relationship. These behaviors may involve repeated unwanted contact, surveillance, intimidation, or threats. Men tend be more likely to engage in more severe and high-risk forms of such behavior.

Counterstrategies include seeking assistance from friends or relatives, avoiding unwanted contact, and obtaining protection from authorities. Stalking and anti-stalking responses may reflect competing evolutionary interests.
