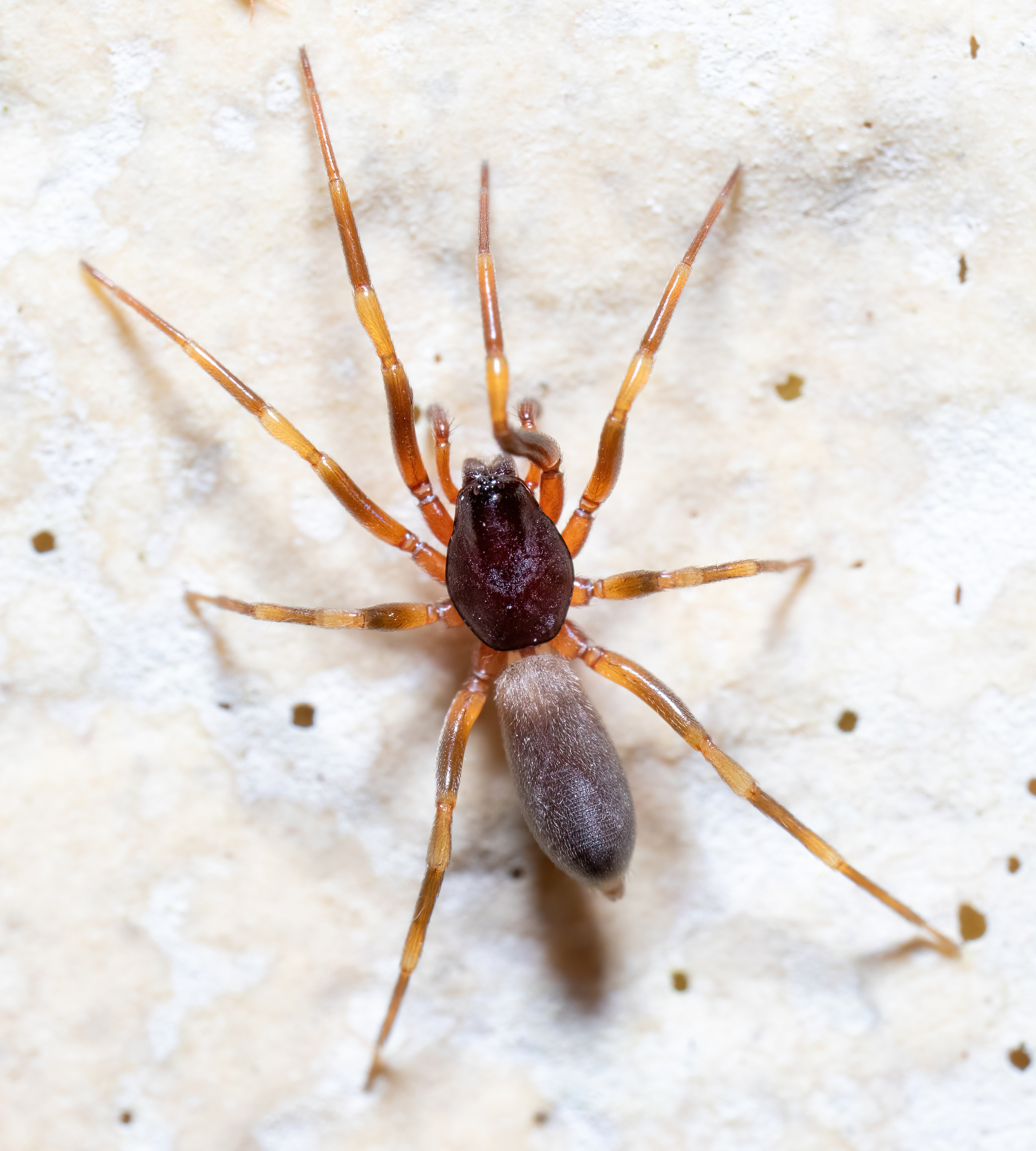

Scientific classification
- Domain: Eukaryota
- Kingdom: Animalia
- Phylum: Arthropoda
- Subphylum: Chelicerata
- Class: Arachnida
- Order: Araneae
- Infraorder: Araneomorphae
- Family: Dysderidae
- Genus: Harpactea
- Species: H. hombergi

Binomial name
- Harpactea hombergi (Scopoli, 1763)

Synonyms
- Aranea hombergii Scopoli, 1763; Dysdera gracilis Wider, 1834; Dysdera harpactes Walckenaer, 1847; Dysdera hombergi (Scopoli, 1763); Dysdera latreillii Blackwall, 1832; Dysdera templetoni Vigors, in Templeton, 1835; Dysdera tesselata Canestrini & Pavesi, 1868; Harpactea haymozi Brignoli, 1979; Harpactes hombergi (Scopoli, 1763), nom. inval.; Harpactes latreillii (Blackwall, 1832), nom. inval.

= Harpactea hombergi =

Genus of spiders

Harpactea hombergi is genus of spiders in the family Dysderidae. It is native to Europe.

== Taxonomy ==
In 1763, Giovanni Antonio Scopoli described a spider under the name Aranea hombergii. In 1830, Charles Walckenaer transferred the species to the genus Dysdera as Dysdera hombergi. In 1835, the genus name "Harpactes" was published for a taxon split off from Dysdera. Authors such as Eugène Simon in 1893 used this genus name for H. hombergi, but when published, Harpactes had already been used for a bird genus, so it was not available. In 1939, W. S. Bristowe published the replacement name Harpactea, with this species becoming Harpactea hombergi.

== Description ==
Mature males of Harpactea hombergi have a body length of 5–6 mm (3/16–1/4 in), mature females 6–7 mm (1/4–9/32 in). The cephalothorax is dark brown, narrowing towards the front. The abdomen is greyish, forming a relatively narrow tube, particularly in males. It has been described as "sausage-shaped". The legs are pale brown with darker rings.

== Distribution and habitat ==
Harpactea hombergi is widespread throughout Europe, including Britain, and has been described as "fairly common". In the daytime, it is found in a silken cell under bark, stones, and similar debris. It emerges at night to hunt a variety of invertebrates.
