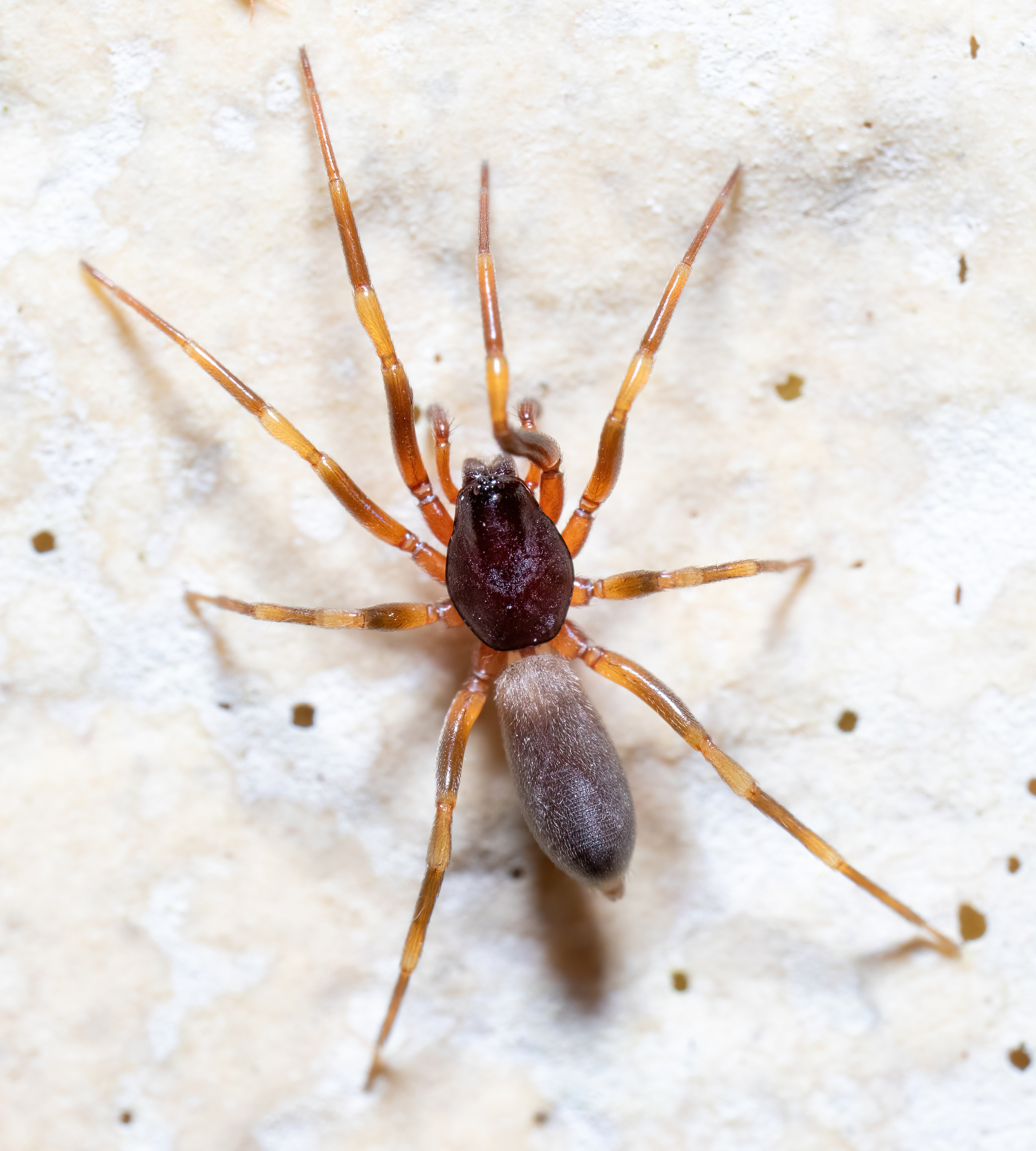
- Harpactea hombergi

Scientific classification
- Kingdom: Animalia
- Phylum: Arthropoda
- Subphylum: Chelicerata
- Class: Arachnida
- Order: Araneae
- Infraorder: Araneomorphae
- Family: Dysderidae
- Genus: Harpactea; Bristowe, 1939

Type species
- Dysdera latreillei Blackwall, 1832, syn. of Harpactea hombergi

Species
- 188, see text.

Synonyms
- Harpactes Templeton, 1835, replaced name, not Harpactes Swainson, 1833

= Harpactea =

Harpactea Temporal range: Palaeogene–present

Genus of spiders

Harpactea is a genus in the family Dysderidae (woodlouse hunting spiders). Harpactea is a replacement name published by W. S. Bristowe in 1939 for the unavailable name "Harpactes" published by R. Templeton in 1835, which had already been used for a genus of birds. They are non-web building predators that forage on the ground and on tree trunks at night, mainly in xerothermic forests. During the day, they hide in silk retreats they build under rocks or bark.

Harpactea sadistica was found to use traumatic insemination, the arthropod behavior of directly inserting its sperm into the body cavity of females. It is the first time it has ever been observed in spiders.

== Description ==
Like all woodlouse hunters, Harpactea have six eyes. The type species, H. hombergi, can grow up to a body length of 6 millimetres (0.24 in). Males and females are similar, but the female has no epigyne.

Like the rest of their family, they are nocturnal. Unlike them, Harpactea do not specialize on hunting woodlice. H. rubicunda also hunts Drassodes and other spiders, but most Harpactea feed on insects in addition to woodlice.

== Taxonomy ==
In 1835, the name "Harpactes" was published by R. Templeton for a taxon split off from the related genus Dysdera. Subsequent authors used this genus name for many years, but when published, Harpactes had already been used for a bird genus, so it was not available. Accordingly, in 1939, W. S. Bristowe published the replacement name Harpactea. The type species is Dysdera latreillei, synonym "Harpactes" latreillei, now accepted as a synonym of Harpactea hombergi.

Templeton did not explain his choice of genus name, but Greek ἁρπακτής, harpaktēs, means 'snatcher', 'plunderer', 'pillager' or 'thief'.

=== Species ===
Almost all species of this genus appear to be endemic to small regions of the Mediterranean. As of April 2024, the World Spider Catalog accepted 213 species from Europe and Northern Africa to Turkmenistan and Iran:

- Harpactea abantia (Simon, 1885) – Greece
- Harpactea abasgiana Zamani & Marusik, 2024 – Georgia
- Harpactea achsuensis Dunin, 1991 – Azerbaijan
- Harpactea acuta Beladjal & Bosmans, 1997 – Algeria
- Harpactea adicensis Řezáč, 2023 – Portugal
- Harpactea aeoliensis Alicata, 1973 – Italy
- Harpactea agnolettii Brignoli, 1978 – Turkey
- Harpactea alanyana Özkütük, Elverici, Marusik & Kunt, 2015 – Turkey
- Harpactea albanica (Caporiacco, 1949) – Albania
- Harpactea alexandrae Lazarov, 2006 – Bulgaria, Romania, Ukraine, Russia (Caucasus)
- Harpactea algarvensis Ferrández, 1990 – Portugal
- Harpactea alicatai Brignoli, 1979 – Italy (Sardinia)
- Harpactea angustata (Lucas, 1846) – Algeria
- Harpactea antoni Bosmans, 2009 – Greece (Lesbos)
- Harpactea apollinea Brignoli, 1979 – Greece
- Harpactea arguta (Simon, 1907) – France, Italy
- Harpactea armenica Dunin, 1989 – Armenia, Iran
- Harpactea arnedoi Kunt, Elverici, Özkütük & Yağmur, 2011 – Turkey
- Harpactea asparuhi Lazarov, 2008 – Bulgaria
- Harpactea ataturi Lazarov, 2026 – Turkey
- Harpactea auresensis Bosmans & Beladjal, 1991 – Algeria
- Harpactea auriga (Simon, 1911) – Algeria
- Harpactea aurigoides Bosmans & Beladjal, 1991 – Algeria
- Harpactea azerbajdzhanica Dunin, 1991 – Azerbaijan
- Harpactea azowensis Charitonov, 1956 – Ukraine, Russia (Europe)
- Harpactea babori (Nosek, 1905) – Bulgaria, Greece, Turkey
- Harpactea ballarini Kunt, Özkütük & Elverici, 2013 – Turkey
- Harpactea bilecenoglui Kunt & Özkütük, 2023 – Turkey
- Harpactea bilgenur Kunt & Özkütük, 2023 – Turkey
- Harpactea blasi Ribera & Ferrández, 1986 – Spain
- Harpactea brachati Wunderlich, 2020 – Turkey
- Harpactea buchari Dunin, 1991 – Azerbaijan
- Harpactea bulgarica Lazarov & Naumova, 2010 – North Macedonia, Bulgaria
- Harpactea caligata Beladjal & Bosmans, 1997 – Algeria
- Harpactea carusoi Alicata, 1974 – Italy, Tunisia
- Harpactea catholica (Brignoli, 1984) – Greece (Crete)
- Harpactea caucasia (Kulczyński, 1895) – Russia (Caucasus), Georgia
- Harpactea cecconii (Kulczyński, 1908) – Cyprus, Greece?
- Harpactea cesari Van Keer, 2009 – Greece (Lesbos)
- Harpactea chaniaensis Bosmans, 2023 – Greece (Crete)
- Harpactea chreensis Bosmans & Beladjal, 1989 – Algeria
- Harpactea christae Bosmans & Beladjal, 1991 – Algeria
- Harpactea christodeltshevi Bayram, Kunt & Yağmur, 2009 – Turkey
- Harpactea clementi Bosmans, 2009 – Greece, Turkey
- Harpactea coccifera Brignoli, 1984 – North Macedonia, Greece (Crete)
- Harpactea colchidis Brignoli, 1978 – Turkey
- Harpactea complicata Deltshev, 2011 – Serbia
- Harpactea corinthia Brignoli, 1984 – Greece
- Harpactea corticalis (Simon, 1882) – France, Italy
- Harpactea crespoi Řezáč, 2023 – Portugal
- Harpactea cressa Brignoli, 1984 – Greece (Crete)
- Harpactea cruriformis Bosmans, 2011 – Greece (Chios)
- Harpactea damini Pavlek & Arnedo, 2020 – Croatia
- Harpactea dashdamirovi Dunin, 1993 – Azerbaijan
- Harpactea decebali Nae, 2021 – Romania
- Harpactea deelemanae Dunin, 1989 – Armenia
- Harpactea deltshevi Dimitrov & Lazarov, 1999 – Bulgaria
- Harpactea dianae Gavalas & Bosmans, 2023 – Greece (Iraklia)
- Harpactea digiovannii Gasparo, 2014 – Greece
- Harpactea diraoi Brignoli, 1978 – Turkey
- Harpactea dobati Alicata, 1974 – Turkey
- Harpactea doblikae (Thorell, 1875) – Bulgaria, Ukraine
- Harpactea dolanskyi Řezáč, 2023 – Portugal
- Harpactea dufouri (Thorell, 1873) – Spain
- Harpactea dumonti Bosmans & Beladjal, 1991 – Algeria
- Harpactea dunini Zamani & Marusik, 2024 – Azerbaijan
- Harpactea elvericii Kunt & Özkütük, 2023 – Turkey
- Harpactea eskovi Dunin, 1989 – Georgia, Armenia
- Harpactea fageli Brignoli, 1980 – Portugal, Spain
- Harpactea fontetareja Wunderlich, 2024 – Portugal
- Harpactea forceps Varol & Danışman, 2018 – Turkey
- Harpactea forcipifera (Simon, 1911) – Algeria
- Harpactea gaditana Pesarini, 1988 – Portugal, Spain
- Harpactea galatica Brignoli, 1978 – Turkey
- Harpactea gennargentu Wunderlich, 1995 – Italy (Sardinia)
- Harpactea globifera (Simon, 1911) – Algeria
- Harpactea gobustanica Nuruyeva & Huseynov, 2022 – Azerbaijan
- Harpactea golovatchi Dunin, 1989 – Armenia
- Harpactea gridellii (Caporiacco, 1951) – Italy
- Harpactea grisea (Canestrini, 1868) – Switzerland, Austria, Italy, Slovenia
- Harpactea gunselorum Gücel, Fuller, Göçmen & Kunt, 2018 – Cyprus
- Harpactea hamidae Beladjal & Abrous, 2023 – Algeria
- Harpactea hauseri Brignoli, 1976 – Greece
- Harpactea heizerensis Bosmans & Beladjal, 1991 – Algeria
- Harpactea heliconia Brignoli, 1984 – Greece
- Harpactea henriquesi Řezáč, 2023 – Portugal
- Harpactea henschi (Kulczyński, 1915) – Bosnia and Herzegovina
- Harpactea herodis Brignoli, 1978 – Israel
- Harpactea hispana (Simon, 1882) – Spain, France
- Harpactea hombergi (Scopoli, 1763) (type species) – Europe
- Harpactea hyrcanica Dunin, 1991 – Azerbaijan
- Harpactea iasoni Gavalas & Bosmans, 2023 – Greece (Iraklia)
- Harpactea ice Komnenov & Chatzaki, 2016 – Greece
- Harpactea incerta Brignoli, 1979 – Greece
- Harpactea incurvata Bosmans & Beladjal, 1991 – Algeria
- Harpactea indistincta Dunin, 1991 – Russia (Caucasus), Azerbaijan
- Harpactea innupta Beladjal & Bosmans, 1997 – Algeria
- Harpactea isaurica Brignoli, 1978 – Turkey
- Harpactea johannitica Brignoli, 1976 – Greece
- Harpactea kalaensis Beladjal & Bosmans, 1997 – Algeria
- Harpactea kalavachiana Gücel, Charalambidou, Göçmen & Kunt, 2019 – Cyprus
- Harpactea kankilicorum Kunt & Özkütük, 2023 – Turkey
- Harpactea karabachica Dunin, 1991 – Azerbaijan
- Harpactea karaschkhan Kunt, Özkütük, Elverici, Marusik & Karakaş, 2016 – Turkey
- Harpactea kareli Bosmans & Beladjal, 1991 – Algeria
- Harpactea kencei Kunt, Elverici, Özkütük & Yağmur, 2011 – Turkey
- Harpactea konradi Lazarov, 2009 – Bulgaria
- Harpactea korenkoi Řezáč, 2023 – Portugal
- Harpactea korgei Brignoli, 1979 – Turkey
- Harpactea krejcii Řezáč, 2023 – Portugal
- Harpactea krueperi (Simon, 1885) – Greece
- Harpactea krumi Lazarov, 2010 – Bulgaria
- Harpactea kubrati Lazarov, 2008 – Bulgaria
- Harpactea kulczynskii Brignoli, 1976 – Albania, Greece
- Harpactea lazarovi Deltshev, 2011 – Bulgaria
- Harpactea lazonum Brignoli, 1978 – Turkey
- Harpactea lepida (C. L. Koch, 1838) – Europe
- Harpactea loebli Brignoli, 1974 – Greece
- Harpactea logunovi Dunin, 1992 – Russia (Caucasus), Georgia
- Harpactea longitarsa Alicata, 1974 – Algeria, Tunisia
- Harpactea longobarda Pesarini, 2001 – Spain (Balearic Is.), Italy, Ukraine
- Harpactea lucdevosi Bosmans, 2023 – Greece (Iraklia)
- Harpactea maelfaiti Beladjal & Bosmans, 1997 – Algeria
- Harpactea magnibulbi Machado & Ferrández, 1991 – Portugal
- Harpactea major (Simon, 1911) – Algeria
- Harpactea mariae Komnenov, 2014 – North Macedonia
- Harpactea martensi Dunin, 1991 – Azerbaijan
- Harpactea mateparlovi Pavlek & Arnedo, 2020 – Croatia
- Harpactea mcheidzeae Dunin, 1992 – Georgia
- Harpactea medeae Brignoli, 1978 – Turkey
- Harpactea mehennii Bosmans & Beladjal, 1989 – Algeria
- Harpactea mentor Lazarov & Naumova, 2010 – North Macedonia, Bulgaria
- Harpactea mertensi Bosmans & Beladjal, 1991 – Algeria
- Harpactea minoccii Ferrández, 1982 – Portugal, Spain
- Harpactea minuta Alicata, 1974 – Tunisia
- Harpactea mithridatis Brignoli, 1979 – Turkey, Georgia
- Harpactea mitidjae Bosmans & Beladjal, 1991 – Algeria
- Harpactea modesta Dunin, 1991 – Caucasus (Russia, Georgia, Azerbaijan)
- Harpactea monicae Bosmans & Beladjal, 1991 – Algeria
- Harpactea mouzaiensis Bosmans & Beladjal, 1989 – Algeria
- Harpactea muscicola (Simon, 1882) – France (Corsica)
- Harpactea nachitschevanica Dunin, 1991 – Azerbaijan
- Harpactea nausicaae Brignoli, 1976 – Albania, Kosovo, North Macedonia, Greece
- Harpactea nenilini Dunin, 1989 – Armenia
- Harpactea nuragica Alicata, 1966 – Italy (Sardinia)
- Harpactea oglasana Gasparo, 1992 – Italy
- Harpactea oranensis Bosmans & Beladjal, 1991 – Algeria
- Harpactea ortegai Ribera & De Mas, 2003 – Spain
- Harpactea osellai Brignoli, 1978 – Turkey
- Harpactea ouarsenensis Bosmans & Beladjal, 1991 – Algeria
- Harpactea ovata Beladjal & Bosmans, 1997 – Algeria
- Harpactea paradoxa Dunin, 1992 – Georgia
- Harpactea parthica Brignoli, 1980 – Iran, Turkmenistan?
- Harpactea pekari Řezáč, 2023 – Portugal
- Harpactea persephone Gasparo, 2011 – Greece (Crete)
- Harpactea petrovi Lazarov & Dimitrov, 2018 – Bulgaria
- Harpactea piligera (Thorell, 1875) – Italy
- Harpactea pisidica Brignoli, 1978 – Turkey
- Harpactea planembolus Wunderlich, 2024 – Portugal
- Harpactea popovi Dimitrov, Deltshev & Lazarov, 2019 – Bulgaria
- Harpactea proxima Ferrández, 1990 – Portugal
- Harpactea pugio Varol & Akpınar, 2016 – Turkey
- Harpactea punica Alicata, 1974 – Algeria, Tunisia
- Harpactea reniformis Beladjal & Bosmans, 1997 – Algeria
- Harpactea rubicunda (C. L. Koch, 1838) – Europe, Caucasus (Russia, Georgia)
- Harpactea rucnerorum Polenec & Thaler, 1975 – Croatia
- Harpactea ruffoi Alicata, 1974 – Tunisia
- Harpactea rugichelis Denis, 1955 – Lebanon
- Harpactea sadistica Řezáč, 2008 – Israel
- Harpactea saeva (Herman, 1879) – Slovakia, Hungary, south-eastern Europe to Ukraine
- Harpactea salvatorei Platania & Arnedo, 2020 – Italy
- Harpactea samuili Lazarov, 2006 – North Macedonia, Bulgaria, Greece
- Harpactea sanctaeinsulae Brignoli, 1978 – Turkey
- Harpactea sanctidomini Gasparo, 1997 – Italy
- Harpactea sardoa Alicata, 1966 – Italy
- Harpactea sbordonii Brignoli, 1978 – Turkey
- Harpactea sciakyi Pesarini, 1988 – Spain
- Harpactea secunda Dunin, 1989 – Armenia
- Harpactea senalbensis Beladjal & Bosmans, 1997 – Algeria
- Harpactea serena (Simon, 1907) – Spain, France
- Harpactea sicula Alicata, 1966 – Italy (Sicily), Malta
- Harpactea simovi Deltshev & Lazarov, 2018 – Bulgaria
- Harpactea sinuata Beladjal & Bosmans, 1997 – Algeria
- Harpactea spasskyi Dunin, 1992 – Ukraine (Crimea), Caucasus (Russia, Georgia)
- Harpactea spilioioannis Bosmans & Gavalas, 2023 – Greece (Iraklia)
- Harpactea spirembolus Russell-Smith, 2011 – Greece (Chios)
- Harpactea srednagora Dimitrov & Lazarov, 1999 – Albania, North Macedonia, Bulgaria
- Harpactea stalitoides Ribera, 1993 – Portugal
- Harpactea stoevi Deltshev & Lazarov, 2018 – Bulgaria
- Harpactea strandi (Caporiacco, 1939) – Italy
- Harpactea strandjica Dimitrov, 1997 – Bulgaria, Turkey
- Harpactea strinatii Brignoli, 1979 – Greece
- Harpactea sturanyi (Nosek, 1905) – Greece, Turkey, Georgia
- Harpactea subiasi Ferrández, 1990 – Portugal
- Harpactea talyschica Dunin, 1991 – Azerbaijan
- Harpactea tavirensis Wunderlich, 2020 – Portugal
- Harpactea tenuiemboli Deltshev, 2011 – Serbia
- Harpactea tergestina Gasparo, 2014 – Italy
- Harpactea terveli Lazarov, 2009 – Bulgaria, Turkey
- Harpactea thaleri Alicata, 1966 – Switzerland, Italy
- Harpactea umay Kunt, Yağmur & Özkütük, 2023 – Turkey
- Harpactea undosa Beladjal & Bosmans, 1997 – Algeria
- Harpactea vagabunda Dunin, 1991 – Azerbaijan
- Harpactea vignai Brignoli, 1978 – Turkey
- Harpactea villehardouini Brignoli, 1979 – Greece
- Harpactea walterdebucki Bosmans, 2023 – Greece (Iraklia)
- Harpactea wolfgangi Komnenov & Chatzaki, 2016 – Greece
- Harpactea yakourensis Beladjal & Bosmans, 1997 – Algeria
- Harpactea yanardagi Kunt & Özkütük, 2023 – Turkey
- Harpactea zagros Zamani & Marusik, 2023 – Iran
- Harpactea zaitzevi Charitonov, 1956 – Georgia, Azerbaijan, Armenia
- Harpactea zannonensis Alicata, 1966 – Italy
- Harpactea zjuzini Dunin, 1991 – Azerbaijan
- Harpactea zoiai Gasparo, 1999 – Greece

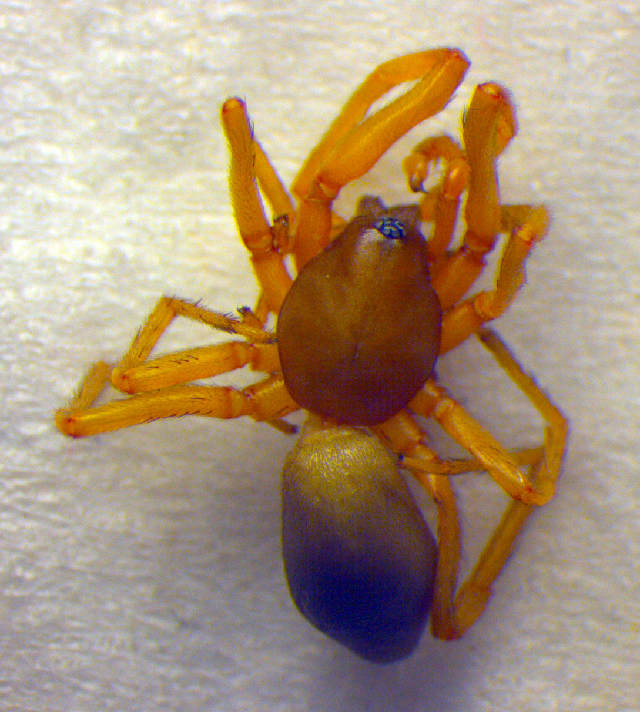
Harpactea rubicunda
