= Semen =

Reproductive biofluid of male or hermaphroditic animals

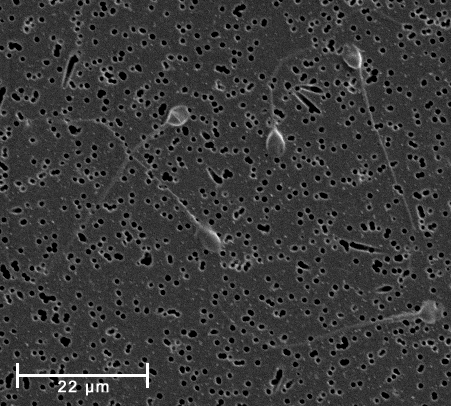
Spermatozoa, in this case human, are a primary component of normal semen, and the agents of fertilization of female ova.

Semen, also known as seminal fluid, is a bodily fluid that contains spermatozoa from the male gonads of animals. In humans and placental mammals, seminal fluid is ejaculated through the penis via the urethra. This fluid contains proteolytic and other enzymes as well as fructose, which together promote the survival of spermatozoa and provide a medium through which they can move (or "swim") from the vagina into the uterus and to the fallopian tubes, where they can fertilize the female ovum and form a zygote (diploid cell).

Semen is collected from animals for artificial insemination or cryoconservation of genetic material. Cryoconservation of animal genetic resources is a practice that calls for the collection of semen in efforts for conservation of a particular breed.

== Physiology ==
=== Fertilization ===
Depending on the species, spermatozoa can fertilize ova externally or internally. In external fertilization, the spermatozoa fertilize the ova directly, outside of the female's sexual organs. Female fish, for example, spawn ova into their aquatic environment, where they are fertilized by the semen of the male fish.

Internal fertilization occurs inside the female's sexual organs after a male inseminates a female through copulation. Most vertebrates, including amphibians, reptiles, birds and monotreme mammals, are inseminated through the cloaca. Marsupials and placental mammals are inseminated through the vagina. In macropods, semen coagulates and forms a mating plug in the vagina after copulation.

=== Human ===
==== Composition ====
During the process of ejaculation, sperm passes through the ejaculatory ducts and mixes with fluids from the seminal vesicles, the prostate, and the bulbourethral glands to form the semen. The seminal vesicles produce a yellowish viscous fluid rich in fructose and other substances that makes up about 70% of human semen. The prostatic secretion, influenced by dihydrotestosterone, is a whitish (sometimes clear), thin fluid containing proteolytic enzymes, citric acid, acid phosphatase and lipids. The bulbourethral glands secrete a clear lubricant into the lumen of the urethra.

Sertoli cells, which nurture and support developing spermatocytes, secrete a fluid into seminiferous tubules that helps transport sperm to the genital ducts. The ductuli efferentes possess cuboidal cells with microvilli and lysosomal granules that modify the ductal fluid by reabsorbing some fluid. Once the semen enters the ductus epididymis the principal cells, which contain pinocytotic vessels indicating fluid reabsorption, secrete glycerophosphocholine which most likely inhibits premature capacitation. The accessory genital ducts, the seminal vesicle, prostate glands, and the bulbourethral glands, produce most of the seminal fluid.

Seminal plasma of humans contains a complex range of organic and inorganic constituents.

The seminal plasma provides a nutritive and protective medium for the spermatozoa during their journey through the female reproductive tract. The normal environment of the vagina is a hostile one (cf. sexual conflict) for sperm cells, as it is very acidic (from the native microflora producing lactic acid), viscous, and patrolled by immune cells. The components in the seminal plasma attempt to compensate for this hostile environment. Basic amines such as putrescine, spermine, spermidine and cadaverine are responsible for the smell and flavor of semen. These alkaline bases counteract and buffer the acidic environment of the vaginal canal, and protect DNA inside the sperm from acidic denaturation.

The components and contributions of semen are as follows:

Gland(s)	Approximate fraction	Description
testes	2–5%	Approximately 200 million to 500 million spermatozoa (also called sperm or spermatozoans), produced in the testes, are released per ejaculation. If a man has undergone a vasectomy, he will have no sperm in the ejaculate.
seminal vesicles	65–75%	Amino acids, citrate, enzymes, flavins, fructose (2–5 mg per mL semen, the main energy source of sperm cells, which rely entirely on sugars from the seminal plasma for energy), phosphorylcholine, prostaglandins (involved in suppressing an immune response by the female against the foreign semen), proteins, vitamin C.
prostate	25–30%	Acid phosphatase, citric acid, fibrinolysin, prostate specific antigen, proteolytic enzymes, zinc. (The zinc level is about 135±40 μg/mL for healthy men. Zinc serves to help to stabilize the DNA-containing chromatin in the sperm cells. A zinc deficiency may result in lowered fertility because of increased sperm fragility. Zinc deficiency can also adversely affect spermatogenesis.)
bulbourethral glands	< 1%	Galactose, mucus (serve to increase the mobility of sperm cells in the vagina and cervix by creating a less viscous channel for the sperm cells to swim through, and preventing their diffusion out of the semen. Contributes to the cohesive jelly-like texture of semen), pre-ejaculate, sialic acid.

A 1992 World Health Organization report described normal human semen as having a volume of 2 mL or greater, pH of 7.2 to 8.0, sperm concentration of 20×10^{6} spermatozoa/mL or more, sperm count of 40×10^{6} spermatozoa per ejaculate or more, and motility of 50% or more with forward progression (categories a and b) of 25% or more with rapid progression (category a) within 60 minutes of ejaculation.

A 2005 review of the literature found that the average reported physical and chemical properties of human semen were as follows:

Property	Per 100 mL	In average volume (3.4 mL)
Calcium (mg)	27.6	0.938
Chloride (mg)	142	4.83
Citrate (mg)	528	18.0
Fructose (mg)	272	9.25
Glucose (mg)	102	3.47
Lactic acid (mg)	62	2.11
Magnesium (mg)	11	0.374
Potassium (mg)	109	3.71
Protein (mg)	5040	171
Sodium (mg)	300	10.2
Urea (mg)	45	1.53
Zinc (mg)	16.5	0.561
Buffering capacity (β)	25	
Osmolarity (mOsm)	354	
pH	7.7	
Viscosity (cP)	3–7	
Values for average volume have been calculated and rounded to three significant figures. All other values are those given in the review.

==== Appearance and consistency ====
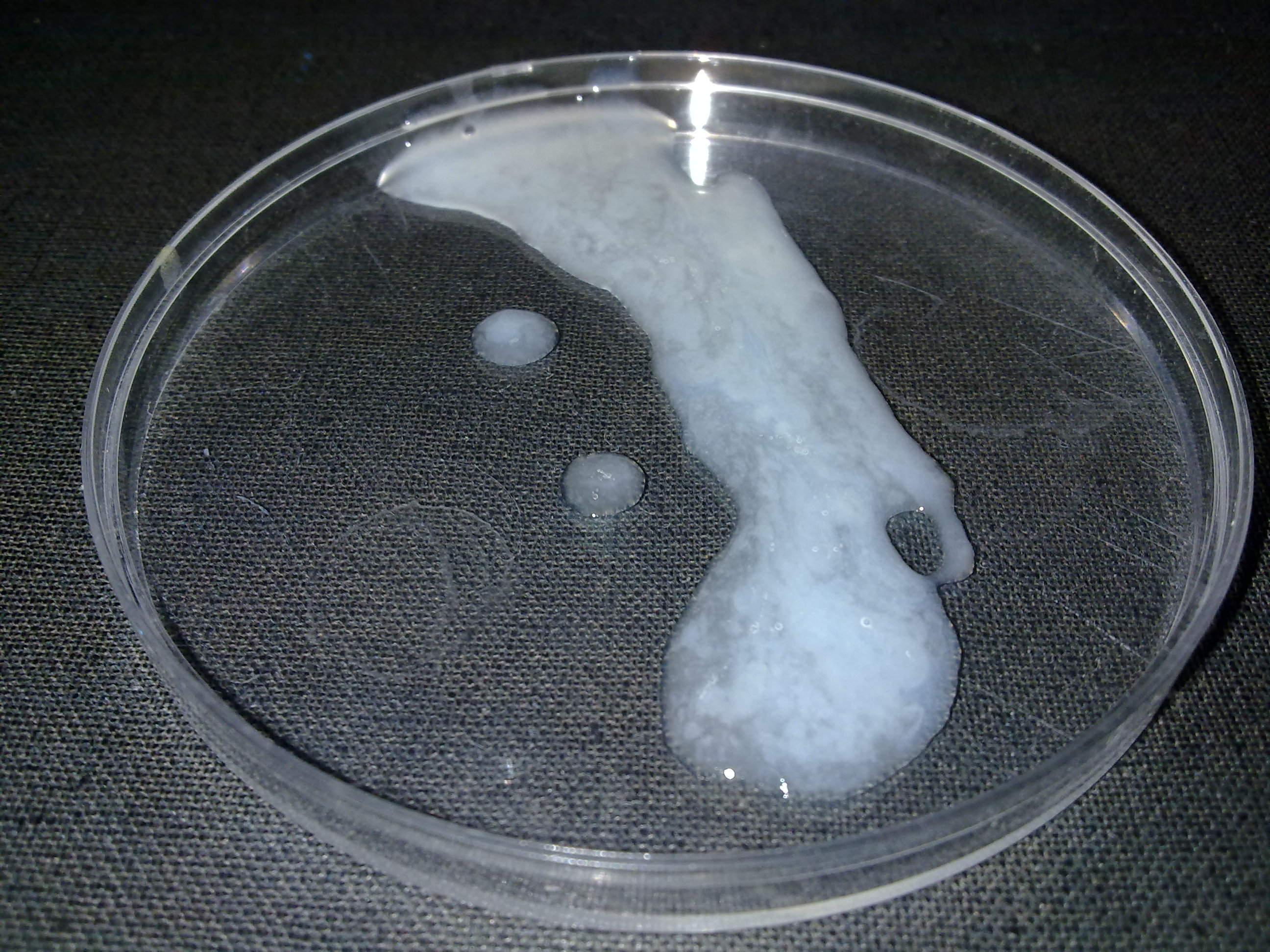
Human semen in a Petri dish

Semen is typically translucent with white, grey or even yellowish tint, with a viscous consistency similar to that of egg whites. Blood in the semen can cause a pink or reddish colour, known as hematospermia, and may indicate a medical problem which should be evaluated by a doctor if the symptom persists.

After ejaculation, the latter part of the ejaculated semen coagulates immediately, forming globules, while the earlier part of the ejaculate typically does not. After a period typically ranging from 15 to 30 minutes, prostate-specific antigen present in the semen causes the decoagulation of the seminal coagulum. It is postulated that the initial clotting helps keep the semen in the vagina, while liquefaction frees the sperm to make their journey to the ova.

A 2005 review found that the average reported viscosity of human semen in the literature was 3–7 centipoises (cP), or, equivalently, millipascal-seconds (mPa·s).

=== Quality ===
Semen quality is a measure of the ability of semen to accomplish fertilization. Thus, it is a measure of fertility in a man. It is the sperm in the semen that is the fertile component, and therefore semen quality involves both sperm quantity and sperm quality.

=== Quantity ===
The volume of semen ejaculate varies but is generally about 1 teaspoonful or less. A review of 30 studies concluded that the average was around 3.4 milliliters (mL), with some studies finding amounts as high as 5.0 mL or as low as 2.3 mL. In a study with Swedish and Danish men, a prolonged interval between ejaculations caused an increase in the sperm count in the semen but not an increase in the semen volume.

=== Storage ===
Semen can be stored in diluents such as the Illini Variable Temperature (IVT) diluent, which have been reported to be able to preserve high fertility of semen for over seven days. The IVT diluent is composed of several salts, sugars and antibacterial agents and gassed with CO_{2}.

Semen cryopreservation can be used for far longer storage durations. For human sperm, the longest reported successful storage with this method is 21 years.

== Health ==
=== Infection transmission ===
Semen can transmit many sexually transmitted infections and pathogens, including viruses like HIV and Ebola. Swallowing semen carries no additional risk other than those inherent in fellatio. This includes transmission risk for sexually transmitted infections such as human papillomavirus or herpes, especially for people with bleeding gums, gingivitis or open sores. Viruses in semen survive for a long time once outside the body.

=== Bloodiness ===
The presence of blood in semen or hematospermia may be undetectable (it can only be seen microscopically) or visible in the fluid. Its cause could be the result of inflammation, infection, blockage, or injury of the male reproductive tract or a problem within the urethra, testicles, epididymis or prostate. It usually clears up without treatment, or with antibiotics, but if persistent further semen analysis and other urogenital system tests might be needed to find out the cause.

=== Allergy ===
In rare circumstances, humans can develop an allergy to semen, called human seminal plasma sensitivity. It appears as a typical localized or systemic allergic response upon contact with seminal fluid. There is no one protein in semen responsible for the reaction. Symptoms can appear after first intercourse or after subsequent intercourse. A semen allergy can be distinguished from a latex allergy by determining if the symptoms disappear with use of a condom. Desensitization treatments are often very successful.

=== Benefits to females ===
Among numerous species in the animal kingdom, females may benefit from absorbing nutrients and proteins from seminal fluid for food, antiviral and antibacterial properties, and enhanced fertilisation. In humans, seminal fluid provides anti-viral activity towards herpes simplex virus and can transfer anti-microbial peptides cathelicidin and lactoferrin. In birds and mammals, mutualistic bacteria such as Lactobacillus have been detected in fluid transferral.

A study on the effect of semen in male-to-female transmission of HIV, in both humans and non-human primates (rhesus macaques), noted that regular intravaginal exposure to a healthy male's semen modulates the microenvironment in the female reproductive tract (FRT), and, paradoxically, improves the resistance in females against acquiring HIV by activating their bodies' anti-HIV mechanisms.

== Society and culture ==
=== Qigong ===
Qigong and Chinese medicine place huge emphasis on a form of energy called 精 (pinyin: jīng, also a morpheme denoting "essence" or "spirit") – which one attempts to develop and accumulate. "Jing" is sexual energy and is considered to dissipate with ejaculation, so masturbation is considered "energy suicide" amongst those who practice this art. According to Qigong theory, energy from many pathways/meridians becomes diverted and transfers itself to the sexual organs during sexual excitement. The ensuing orgasm and ejaculation will then finally expel the energy from the system completely. The Chinese proverb 一滴精，十滴血 (pinyin: yì dī jīng, shí dī xuè, literally: a drop of semen is equal to ten drops of blood) illustrates this point.

The scientific term for semen in Chinese is 精液 (pinyin: jīng yè, literally: fluid of essence/jing) and the term for sperm is 精子 (pinyin: jīng zǐ, literally: basic element of essence/jing), two modern terms with classical referents.

=== Indian philosophy ===
The Upanishads, principal scriptures of Hinduism, propound a creation theory wherein the supreme self transmutes itself to become the creation by exerting tremendous effort and strenuous labor (śrama), which is enabled on by tapas or "heat", considered as the most important element in the entire creation process. The word tapas, in Sanskrit literature, is understood as a reference to the sexual heat or warmth that incubates the birth of life. The root word tapas was commonly used for descriptions of sexual desire and love. The word kama (desire) was homologized with tapas (heat) to explain the emotions and energy that leads to intercourse.

The connection between bodily heat (tapas) and sexual desire (kama) is not just metaphorical but is found to be rooted in physiology, "All adolescent and fertile adults are hot." The internal bodily heat, apart from being present inherently in certain body types (thinness more heat), is generated by processes such as "menstruation, childbirth, consumption of hot food, sexual desire" and certain emotions like anger and jealousy. While heat is regarded as necessary to sustain life, with complete coldness corresponding to death, excessive bodily heat is "undesirable and dangerous" as it causes the body to deteriorate by internal consumption. A state of "relative coolness" is considered ideal.

Women, in general, are deemed as relatively hotter than men, partly due to menstruation and pregnancies, which result in higher concentrations of blood to the womb. Menstruation, in particular is considered as extremely heating, a process likened to "boiling over" and is sought to be alleviated by acts such as menstrual seclusion, and oiling-bathing of the menstruating women, apart from rituals. In the Indian state of Kerala, a ritual conducted for virgin girls was talikettukalyanam, in which the girls are wedded to a boy or a man in a mock-marriage and after consummating are separated without any claims on each other. In sexually matured females, menstruation and unfulfilled sexual desire is believed to boil over their blood, with the heat making them violent and maniacal unless they are regularly cooled down by man's semen, which, is considered to be an extremely cooling substance. Though excessive heat in a woman is synonymous with "shakti and latent fertility", it is potentially dangerous and must be restrained, lessened and transmuted. This is sought to be achieved by "binding", wherein women wear tight upper clothing, bangles and necklaces; and "sealing the body" in oil baths and herbal powders; and through regular sexual intercourse. A woman is said to be really cool only after childbirth and had breast-feed her baby.

Men, too, overheat in absence of regular ejaculation and can become a danger. In men, the semen heats up gradually and, if not ejaculated, should be channelled through the kundalini by means of demanding yogic practices. Hindu men have an ascetic–erotic conundrum, (Note: In Hinduism, the earlier renunciate traditions viewed loss of semen as loss of vigor and advocated an ascetic lifestyle, whilst negating women as impure and obstacles in the path of spiritual liberation. In contrast, the later Tantric traditions, realising the inherent divinity in the act of sexual union-as a means for the couple to realise their unity with Shiva-Shakti, regarded woman as the Goddess, and viewed ejaculation as an offering akin to the oil poured in the sacrificial fire of a Vedic ritual. The Kularnava Tantra declared asceticism is a practice to deceive the world, and those who punish their body for the sake of enlightenment are no better than animals in the wild.) they believe abstinence yields power as well as in satisfying their desires as a necessity. Morris Carstairs, in a report on culture and personality study, stated that Indian men who are seemingly healthy are preoccupied with real or imagined spermatorrhea, with the belief that semen is not easily formed and "it takes 40 days, and 40 drops of blood, to make one drop of semen". He observed that when sexual behaviours are restricted, sexual incontinence follows with resultant guilt. In females, the corresponding fear of loss of sexual fluids is found in anxieties over vaginal discharge (sravam), which is believed to be a cooling body lubricant but whose loss leaves them "overheated and disarticulated, in a state of disease." Anxiety about loss of sexual fluids is caused from a misdiagnosis of sexual guilt, instead of correcting the psyche of a person the focus is shifted onto the substance (semen, sravam), resulting in subsequent pathologization.

In Ayurveda, the term generally used for both male semen and female egg cell is Shukra. People with healthy shukra appear stronger and confident, with eyes and skin that seem lustrous. Those who lack higher shukra appear exhausted and lackluster, while also struggling in creative endeavours. Drinking lots of water and proper digestion of highly nourishing foods (milk, ghee, nuts) yield healthy shukra. Charaka states brahmacharya (abstinence), proper diet, and rest/sleep as the three pillars of life. Indulgence in sexual activity is healthy for stronger individuals, but in weaker people it weakens them further, and is sought to be alleviated by abstinence as it restores shukra, which is always produced as a result of the digestion of food one eats. Ayurveda makes no preference for a celibate or monastic lifestyle, nor does it stress on morality being a part of human sexuality. The health of an individual's shukra and their dharma decides the degree of their sexual activity; for a householder sexual expression is common, while it is not so for a renunciate monk.

=== Greek philosophy ===
In Ancient Greece, Aristotle remarked on the importance of semen: "For Aristotle, semen is the residue derived from nourishment, that is of blood, that has been highly concocted to the optimum temperature and substance. This can only be emitted by the male as only the male, by nature of his very being, has the requisite heat to concoct blood into semen." According to Aristotle, there is a direct connection between food and semen: "Sperms are the excretion of our food, or to put it more clearly, as the most perfect component of our food."

The connection between food and physical growth, on the one hand, and semen, on the other, allows Aristotle to warn against "engag[ing] in sexual activity at too early an age ... [since] this will affect the growth of their bodies. Nourishment that would otherwise make the body grow is diverted to the production of semen. Aristotle is saying that at this stage the body is still growing; it is best for sexual activity to begin when its growth is 'no longer abundant', for when the body is more or less at full height, the transformation of nourishment into semen does not drain the body of needed material."

Additionally, "Aristotle tells us that the region round the eyes was the region of the head most fruitful of seed ("most seedy", σπερματικώτατος), pointing to generally recognised effects upon the eyes of sexual indulgence and to practices which imply that seed comes from liquid in the region of the eyes." This may be explained by the belief of the Pythagoreans that "semen is a drop of the brain [τὸ δε σπέρμα εἶναι σταγόνα ἐγκέφαλου]."

Greek Stoic philosophy conceived of the Logos spermatikos ("seminal word") as the principle of active reason that fecundated passive matter. The Jewish philosopher Philo similarly spoke in sexual terms of the Logos as the masculine principle of reason that sowed seeds of virtue in the feminine soul.

The Christian Platonist Clement of Alexandria likened the Logos to physical blood as the "substance of the soul", and noted that some held "that the animal semen is substantially foam of its blood". Clement reflected an early Christian view that "the seed ought not be wasted nor scattered thoughtlessly nor sown in a way it cannot grow."

Women were believed to have their own version, which was stored in the womb and released during climax. Retention was believed to cause female hysteria.

In ancient Greek religion as a whole, semen is considered a form of miasma, and ritual purification was to be practised after its discharge.

=== Reverence ===
In some pre-industrial societies, semen and other body fluids were revered because they were believed to be magical. Blood is an example of such a fluid, but semen was also widely believed to be of supernatural origin and effect and was, as a result, considered holy or sacred. The ancient Sumerians believed that semen was "a divine substance, endowed on humanity by Enki", the god of water. The semen of a god was believed to have magical generative powers. In Sumerian mythology, when Enki's seed was planted in the ground, it caused the spontaneous growth of eight previously nonexistent plants. Enki was believed to have created the Tigris and Euphrates rivers by masturbating and ejaculating into their empty riverbeds. The Sumerians believed that rain was the semen of the sky-god An, which fell from the heavens to inseminate his consort, the earth-goddess Ki, causing her to give birth to all the plants of the earth.

The orchid's twin bulbs were thought to resemble the testicles, which is the etymology of the disease orchiditis. There was an ancient Roman belief that the flower sprang from the spilled semen of copulating satyrs.

In a number of mythologies around the world, semen is often considered analogous to breast milk. In the traditions of Bali, it is considered to be the returning or refunding of the milk of the mother in an alimentary metaphor. The wife feeds her husband who returns to her his semen, the milk of human kindness.

Nancy Friday's book, Men in Love – Men's Sexual Fantasies: The Triumph of Love over Rage (1982), suggests that swallowing semen is high on a man's intimacy scale.

=== Espionage ===
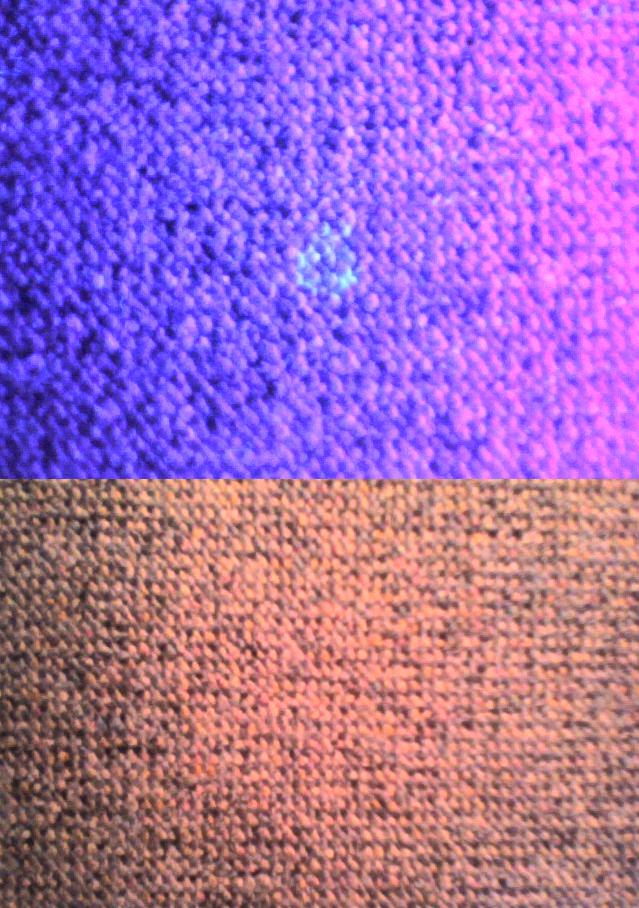
Semen stain on carpet observed with and without ultraviolet light

When the British Secret Intelligence Service discovered that semen made a good invisible ink, Sir Mansfield George Smith-Cumming noted of his agents that "Every man (is) his own stylo".

=== Ingestion ===
Ingestion of semen offers nominal nutritional value, but has been recorded for social and interpersonal purposes, with some religious or cultural traditions, incorporating it as a practice. It is a common element of oral sex in sexual relationships, and is a common act in pornography, with a number of different kinds of practices depicted.

=== Euphemisms ===
A huge variety of euphemisms and dysphemisms have been invented to describe semen.

Slang terms in English for semen include cum, jism (also shortened to jizz), spunk (primarily British English), spooge, splooge, load, nut, seed, and love juice. The term cum can also refer to an orgasm (when used as a verb rather than as a noun). The term nut originally referred to a testicle, but can be used to refer to both semen and ejaculation.

== See also ==
- Cum shot
- Milt
- Semen extender
- Seminal fluid protein
- Sperm donation
- Spermadhesin
- Spermatozoon
- Vaginal lubrication
