= Bristowia heterospinosa =

Scientific classification
- Kingdom: Animalia
- Phylum: Arthropoda
- Subphylum: Chelicerata
- Class: Arachnida
- Order: Araneae
- Infraorder: Araneomorphae
- Family: Salticidae
- Genus: Bristowia
- Species: B. heterospinosa

Binomial name
- Bristowia heterospinosa Reimoser, 1934

Species of spider

Bristowia heterospinosa is a species of jumping spider from Asia. It was first found on Krakatau, but later also in Vietnam, Malaysia, Singapore, China, Korea and Japan.

Although it was the only species in its genus until 2004, when a second species was found in Africa, it is quite often found in habitats such as garden litter.

== Description ==
Both sexes are from 3 to 4 mm long. The deep orange cephalothorax is almost rhombus shaped when viewed from the side. The eye field is black. The pale whitish orange, elongate oval abdomen is narrower than the front part. A darkish line runs like a ring around it when viewed from the top. Some dark marks are present. The legs are relatively long and slender, with the first pair of legs much more robust than the others. The spines on the first pair are very long and strong, while those on the other legs are weak, and almost colorless, which gave the species its name. The robust parts of the front legs are brown, all the other segments and legs resemble the abdomen in color.

Male specimen in Japan
