= Harpactea sadistica =

Scientific classification
- Kingdom: Animalia
- Phylum: Arthropoda
- Subphylum: Chelicerata
- Class: Arachnida
- Order: Araneae
- Infraorder: Araneomorphae
- Family: Dysderidae
- Genus: Harpactea
- Species: H. sadistica

Binomial name
- Harpactea sadistica Řezáč, 2008

Species of spider

Harpactea sadistica is a species of dysderine spider, found only in Israel. It was first described in 2008.

== Description ==
Both sexes have the same body characteristics. The length of the pale yellow-brown, smooth carapace ranges from 1.1 to 1.7 mm. The legs are pale yellow, with the first two pairs darker than the other two. The cylindrical, whitish opisthosoma is 2.3 mm long in the holotype specimen. The tip of the embolus of the male resembles the tip of a hypodermic needle, and the vulva of the female is atrophied.

== Ecology ==
Harpactea sadistica probably exhibits an annual lifecycle. Eggs are laid from March to April. The species is found in woodlands dominated by Quercus calliprinos and pine plantations, and in steppe habitats where Asphodelus is predominant.

== Traumatic insemination ==
Harpactea sadistica is the first spider species – and the first member of the entire subphylum Chelicerata – found to use traumatic insemination. The males have specialized genital structures at the pedipalps that are adapted to grip the female and inject the sperm, using a structure resembling a hypodermic needle. After positioning himself, the male pierces the female on both sides and injects the sperm directly into the ovaries, resulting in about eight holes in two rows. Consistent with the modified mating behavior, the spermathecae of the female, which normally store received sperm, are weakly developed in this species.

Whereas in other spiders the eggs are fertilized only when laid, in this special case fertilization takes place at the moment of insemination, and develop as embryos before being laid.

This behavior seems to have evolved in order to ensure that the mating male is also the one providing the sperm for the progeny. Spermathecae fertilize the eggs with the sperm of the last mating male. With the adaption of traumatic insemination, the male ensures that his sperm will be used, circumventing this mechanism.

Like many other spider species, H. sadistica has elaborated mating rituals preceding the insemination, involving tapping the female, subduing her and wrapping himself around her in order to position himself prior to insemination.

== Name ==
The species name refers to the seemingly sadistic habit of stabbing the body cavity of the female.
