= Sexual conflict =

Term in evolutionary biology

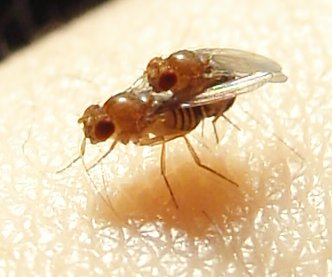
Drosophila melanogaster (shown mating) is an important model organism in sexual conflict research.

Sexual conflict or sexual antagonism occurs when the two sexes have conflicting optimal fitness strategies concerning reproduction, particularly over the mode and frequency of mating, potentially leading to an evolutionary arms race between males and females. In one example, males may benefit from multiple matings, while multiple matings may harm or endanger females due to the anatomical differences of that species. Sexual conflict underlies the evolutionary distinction between male and female.

The development of an evolutionary arms race can also be seen in the chase-away sexual selection model, which places inter-sexual conflicts in the context of secondary sexual characteristic evolution, sensory exploitation, and female resistance. According to chase-away selection, continuous sexual conflict creates an environment in which mating frequency and male secondary sexual trait development are somewhat in step with the female's degree of resistance. It has primarily been studied in animals, though it can in principle apply to any sexually reproducing organism, such as plants and fungi. There is some evidence for sexual conflict in plants.

Sexual conflict takes two major forms:

1. Interlocus sexual conflict is the interaction of a set of antagonistic alleles at one or more loci in males and females. An example is conflict over mating rates. Males frequently have a higher optimal mating rate than females because in most animal species, they invest fewer resources in offspring than their female counterparts. Therefore, males have numerous adaptations to induce females to mate with them. Another well-documented example of inter-locus sexual conflict are the seminal fluid proteins of Drosophila melanogaster, which up-regulate females' egg-laying rate and reduce her desire to re-mate with another male (serving the male's interests), but also shorten the female's lifespan, reducing her fitness.
2. Intralocus sexual conflict – This kind of conflict represents a tug of war between natural selection on both sexes and sexual selection on one sex. An example would be the bill color in zebra finches. Ornamentation could be costly to produce, but it is important in mate choice. However, it also makes an individual more vulnerable to predators. As a result, the alleles for such phenotypic traits exist under antagonistic selection. This conflict is resolved via elaborate sexual dimorphism thus maintaining sexually antagonistic alleles in the population. Evidence indicates that intralocus conflict may be an important constraint in the evolution of many traits.

Sexual conflict may lead to antagonistic co-evolution, in which one sex (usually male) evolves a favorable trait that is offset by a countering trait in the other sex. Similarly, interlocus sexual conflict can be the result of what is called a perpetual cycle. The perpetual cycle begins with the traits that favor male reproductive competition, which eventually manifests into male persistence. These favorable traits will cause a reduction in the fitness of females due to their persistence. Following this event, females may develop a counter-adaptation, that is, a favorable trait that reduces the direct costs implemented by males. This is known as female resistance. After this event, females' fitness depression decreases, and the cycle starts again. Interlocus sexual conflict reflects interactions among mates to achieve their optimal fitness strategies and can be explained through evolutionary concepts.

Sensory exploitation by males is one mechanism that involves males attempting to overcome female reluctance. It can result in chase-away selection, which then leads to a co-evolutionary arms race. There are also other mechanisms involved in sexual conflict such as traumatic insemination, forced copulation, penis fencing, love darts and others.

Female resistance traditionally includes reducing negative effects to mechanisms implemented by males, but outside the norm may include sexual cannibalism, increased fitness in females on offspring and increased aggression to males.

Some regard sexual conflict as a subset of sexual selection (which was traditionally regarded as mutualistic), while others suggest it is a separate evolutionary phenomenon.

== Conflicts of interest between sexes ==
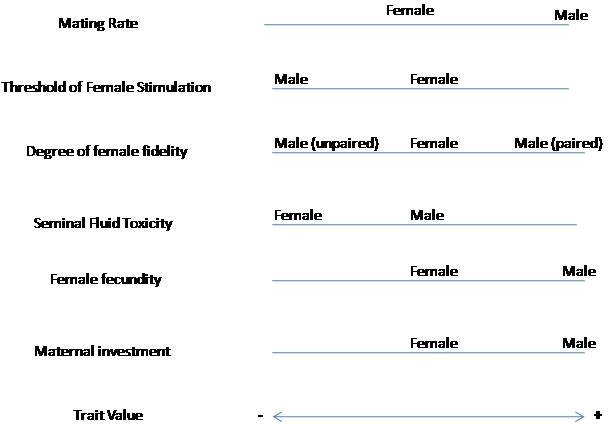
Various factors that affect sexual conflict between a male and female. Only the relative positions of the optimal trait values are important as the comparative positions of the male and female provide information regarding their sexual conflict. The trait value bar at the bottom of this figure indicates the relative intensity of each trait.

The differences between male and female general evolutionary interests can be better understood through the analysis of the various factors that affect sexual conflict. In situations involving a male and female, only the relative positions of the optimal trait values are important as it is their comparative positions that provide insight into the resulting conflict. The trait value bar at the bottom of the accompanying figure indicates the relative intensity of each trait. The left side represents the poorly developed end of intensity range, while the right side represents the strongly developed end of the range.

Males and females differ in the following general components of fitness, thus leading to sexual conflict. Refer to the accompanying figure in this section.

=== Mating rate ===
Males generally increase their fitness by mating with multiple mates, while females are on the middle section of the range because they do not favor a particular side of the spectrum. For instance, females tend to be the choosier sex, but the presence of female sexual promiscuity in Soay sheep show that females might not have an established mating preference. However, Soay sheep are a breed of domestic sheep, ergo might not be a subject to traditional evolutionary mechanisms due to human interference.

=== Female stimulation threshold ===
Generally, females benefit from being more selective than males would like them to be. For example, the Neotropical spider, Paratrechalea ornata, displays nuptial gift-giving behaviors during courtship as a part of their male mating efforts. These nuptials gifts allow the male to control copulation duration and to increase the speed of female oviposition.

=== Degree of female fidelity ===
Because female fidelity depends on the species' particular mating system, therefore they are in the middle section of the spectrum. However, males seeking mates have different preferences depending on whether they are unpaired or paired. Paired males benefit from high female fidelity, while unpaired males benefit from low female fidelity in order to increase their mating frequencies.

=== Toxicity of seminal fluid ===
Females benefit from low seminal fluid toxicity, while males benefit from a high toxicity level as it increases their competitive edge.

=== Female fecundity ===
Males benefit from a high female fecundity as it means that females can produce more offspring and have a higher potential for reproduction. Females also benefit from high fecundity, and thus this trait is probably more affected by classical natural selection.

=== Maternal investment ===
In many species, males benefit from high maternal investment as it allows them to preserve more energy and time for additional matings rather than investing their resources on one offspring. Females are expected to invest a certain amount of time and resources, but it can also be detrimental to the female if too much maternal investment is expected.

== Sex-biased gene expression ==
Natural and/or sexual selection on traits that influence the fitness of either male or female give rise to fundamental phenotypic and behavioral differences between them referred to as sexual dimorphism. Selective pressures on such traits give rise to differences in expression of these genes either at transcriptional or translational level. In certain cases these differences are as dramatic as genes not being expressed at all in either of the sexes. These differences in gene expression are the result of either natural selection on reproductive potential and survival traits of either sex or sexual selection on traits relevant to intra-sexual competition and inter-sexual mate choice.

Sex-biased genes could either be male- or female-biased and sequence analysis of these protein coding genes have revealed their faster rate of evolution which has been attributed to their positive selection vs. reduced selective constraint. Apart from sex specific natural selection and sexual selection that includes both intersexual and intrasexual selection, a third phenomenon also explains the differences in gene expressions between two sexes – sexual antagonism. Sexual antagonism represents an evolutionary conflict at a single or multiple locus that contribute differentially to the male and female fitness. The conflict occurs as the spread of an allele at one locus in either male or female that lowers the fitness of the other sex. This gives rise to different selection pressure on males and females. Since the allele is beneficial for one sex and detrimental to the other, counter adaptations in the form of suppressor alleles at different genetic loci can develop that reduce the effects of deleterious allele, giving rise to differences in gene expression. Selection on such traits in males would select for suppressor alleles in females thus increasing the chances of retaining the deleterious allele in the population in interlocus sexual conflict.

The retention of such antagonistic alleles in a population could also be explained in terms of increase in the net fitness of the maternal line, for example, the locus for male sexual orientation in humans was identified on subtelomeric regions of X chromosomes after studies conducted on 114 families of homosexual men. Same sex orientation was found to be higher in maternal uncles and male cousins of the gay subjects. An evolutionary model explained this finding in terms of increased fertility of the females in maternal lines, hence adding to net fitness gain.

== Evidence of positive selection in sexually antagonistic genes ==
Combined data from coding sequence studies in C. elegans, Drosophila, Humans and Chimps show a similar pattern of molecular evolution in sex-biased genes, i.e. most of the male- and female-biased genes when compared to genes equally expressed in both had higher Ka/Ks ratio. Male-biased genes show greater divergence than female-biased genes. The Ka/Ks ratio was higher for male-biased genes which are expressed exclusively in reproductive tissues e.g. testis in primate lineages. In C. elegans, which is an androdioecious species (a population consisting of only hermaphrodites and males), the rate of evolution for genes expressed during spermatogenesis was higher in males than in hermaphrodites. In Drosophila, interspecies divergence was found to be higher than intraspecific polymorphism at non synonymous sites of male-biased genes which elucidated the role of positive selection and showed that male-biased genes undergo frequent adaptive evolution. Although positive evolution is associated with most of the male and female-biased genes, it's difficult to isolate genes which shown bias solely due to sexual conflict/antagonism. Nevertheless, since sexually antagonistic genes give rise to biased expression and most biased genes are under positive selection we can argue the same in favor of sexually antagonistic genes. A similar trend as seen in coding sequence evolution was seen with gene expression levels. Interspecific expression divergence was higher than intraspecific expression polymorphism. Positive selection in Accessory gland proteins (Acps) (produced by males) and Female Reproductive Tract Proteins (Frtps) has also been reported previously.

== Sexual antagonism, sex linkage and genomic location of genes under conflict ==
Although X chromosomes have been considered as hot spots for accumulating sexually antagonistic alleles, other autosomal locations have also been reported to harbor sexually antagonistic alleles. The XY, XX and ZW, ZZ system of sex determination allows accelerated fixation of alleles that are sex-linked recessive, male-beneficial and female-detrimental due to constant exposure to positive selection acting on heterogametic sex (XY, ZW) as compared to purifying selection removing the alleles only in homozygous state. In case of partial or completely dominant sex linked traits which are detrimental to male, the probability of selecting for the allele would be 2/3 as compared to selecting against probability of 1/3. Considering the above scenario it is likely that X and W chromosomes would harbor many sexually antagonistic alleles. However, recently Innocenti et al. identified sexually antagonistic candidate genes in Drosophila melanogaster that contributed about 8% of the total genes. These were distributed on X, second and third chromosomes. Accessory gland proteins which are male-biased and shows positive selection reside entirely on autosomes. They are partially sexually antagonistic as they are not expressed in females and dominant in nature and hence under represented on X.

== Evolutionary theories ==
Interlocus sexual conflict involves numerous evolutionary concepts that are applied to a wide range of species in order to provide explanations for the interactions between sexes. The conflict between the interactions of male and females can be described as an ongoing evolutionary arms race.

According to Darwin (1859), sexual selection occurs when some individuals are favored over others of the same sex in the context of reproduction. Sexual selection and sexual conflict are related because males usually mate with multiple females while females typically mate with fewer males. It is hypothesized that both chase away selection and sexual conflict may be the result of males' use of sensory exploitation. Males are able to exploit females' sensory biases due to the existence of female choice. For example, females may behave in ways that are considerably biased towards mating and fertilization success due to the attractiveness of males who exhibit a deceptive or exaggerated secondary sex characteristic. Since some male traits are detrimental to females, the female becomes insensitive to these traits. Sexually antagonistic co-evolution entails the cyclic process between the exaggerated (persistent) traits and the resistant traits by the sexes. If male traits that decrease female fitness spread, then female preference will change.

=== Female resistance ===
Female resistance is an evolutionary concept where females develop traits to counter the males' influence. This concept can be supported by the examples of sexual conflict in the water strider and pygmy fish.

Male water striders exhibit forced copulation on the female. As a result, the female will struggle with the male to reduce the detrimental effects. Female struggle is a by-product of female resistance.

The population of pygmy fish Xiphophorus pygmaeus or pygmy sword-tail fish initially consisted of small males. A study tested female choice using large hetero-specific males. They found that the female pygmy swordtail fish favored larger sized males, indicating that females changed their preference from small males to large males. This pattern of female preference for larger male body size disappeared in populations consisting of smaller males. The study concluded that this behavior is caused by female resistance and not due to a general preference for larger body size males.

=== Sperm competition ===
Sperm competition is an evolutionary concept developed by Geoff Parker (1970) and describes a mechanism by which different males will compete to fertilize a female's egg. Sperm competition selects for both offensive and defensive traits. Offensive sperm competition consists of males displacing sperm from the previous male as well as the use of toxic sperm to destroy rival sperm. Conversely, defensive sperm competition consists of males preventing females from re-mating by prolonging the duration of their own mating or by restricting the females' interest in other males. Sperm competition can be exhibited throughout behavioral, morphological and physiological male adaptations. Some examples of behavioral adaptations are mate guarding or forced copulation. Morphological adaptations may include male claspers, altered genitalia (e.g. spiky genitals) and copulatory plugs (i.e. mating plugs). Physiological adaptations may consist of toxic sperm or other chemicals in the seminal fluid that delays a female's ability to re-mate.

Sexual conflict is exhibited when males target other males through sperm competition. For example, Iberian rock lizard (Lacerta monticola) males create hard mating plugs. These mating plugs are placed within the female cloaca instantly after copulation, which was hypothesized to function as a "chastity belt." However, the study found no evidence to support the hypothesis, as males were able to displace the mating plugs of other males. There is no direct conflict between males and females, but males may evolve manipulative traits to counter the removal of their mating plugs.

Males also develop different behaviors for paternity assurance. A study of sperm competition revealed that there was a positive relationship between testis size and levels of sperm competition within groups. Higher levels of sperm competition were correlated to larger accessory reproductive glands, seminal vesicles, and interior prostates. Larger mating plugs were less likely to be removed.

== Advantages and disadvantages ==
=== Males ===
Males inflicting harm on females is a by-product of male adaptation in the context of sperm competition. The advantages to males may include: a) a decrease in the likelihood of females re-mating, b) the ability to produce more offspring, c) sperm maintenance, and d) sperm storage. These advantages are seen throughout all variations of mate traits such as toxic sperm, spiky genitalia, forced copulation, penis fencing, love darts, mate guarding, harassment/aggressive behavior, and traumatic insemination.

=== Females ===
Females can experience a wide range of detrimental effects from males. This may include: a) longevity reduction, b) distortion in feeding behaviors (which could increase food intake as seen in Drosophila fruit flies) c) increased risk of infection, d) wound repair through energy consumption, e) male manipulation of female reproductive schedules, f) susceptibility to predators, and g) reduced female immune response.

=== Hermaphrodites ===
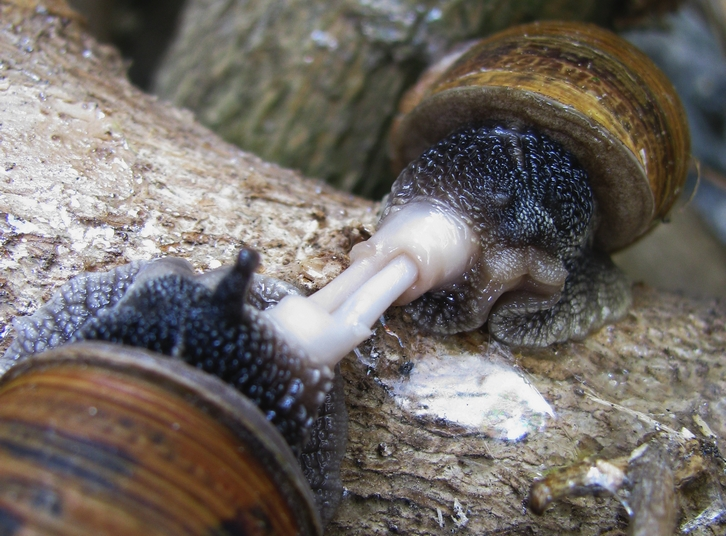
Hermaphroditic mating Cornu aspersum (garden snails)

Hermaphrodites are organisms that have both male and female reproductive organs. It is possible for there to be sexual conflict within a species that is entirely hermaphroditic. An example of such is seen in some hermaphroditic flatworms such as Pseudobiceros bedfordi. Their mating ritual involves penis fencing in which both try to stab to inseminate the other and at the same time avoid being stabbed. Being inseminated represents a cost because striking and hypodermic insemination can cause considerable injury; as a result, the conflict lies in adapting to be more adept at striking and parrying and avoiding being stabbed.

Also the earthworm Lumbricus terrestris show behavior where both parts try to make sure as much sperm as possible is absorbed by their partner. To do this they use 40 to 44 copulatory setae to pierce into the partner's skin, causing substantial damage.

There are cases where hermaphrodites can fertilize their own eggs, but this is usually rare. Most hermaphrodites take on the role of a male or female to reproduce. Sexual conflict over mating can cause hermaphrodites to either cooperate or display aggressive behavior in the context of gender choice.

== Sexual conflict before and during mating ==
=== Infanticide ===
Infanticide is a behavior that occurs in many species in which an adult kills the younger individuals, including eggs. Sexual conflict is one of the most common causes, although there are exceptions as demonstrated by the male bass eating their own juvenile descendants. Although males usually exhibit such behavior, females can also behave in the same way.

Infanticide has been extensively studied in vertebrates such as hanuman langurs, big cats, house sparrows and mice. However, this behavior also occurs in the invertebrates. For example, in the spider Stegodyphus lineatus, males invade female nests and toss out their egg sacs. Females only have one clutch in their lifetime, and experience reduced reproductive success if the clutch is lost. This results in vicious battles where injury and even death can occur. Jacana jacana, a tropical wading bird, provides an example of infanticide by the female sex. Females guard a territory while males care for their young. As males are a limited resource, other females will commonly displace or kill their young. Males can then mate again and care for the young of the new female.

This behavior is costly to both sides, and counter-adaptations have evolved in the affected sex ranging from cooperative defense of their young to loss minimization strategies such as aborting existing offspring upon the arrival of a new male (the Bruce effect).

=== Traumatic insemination ===
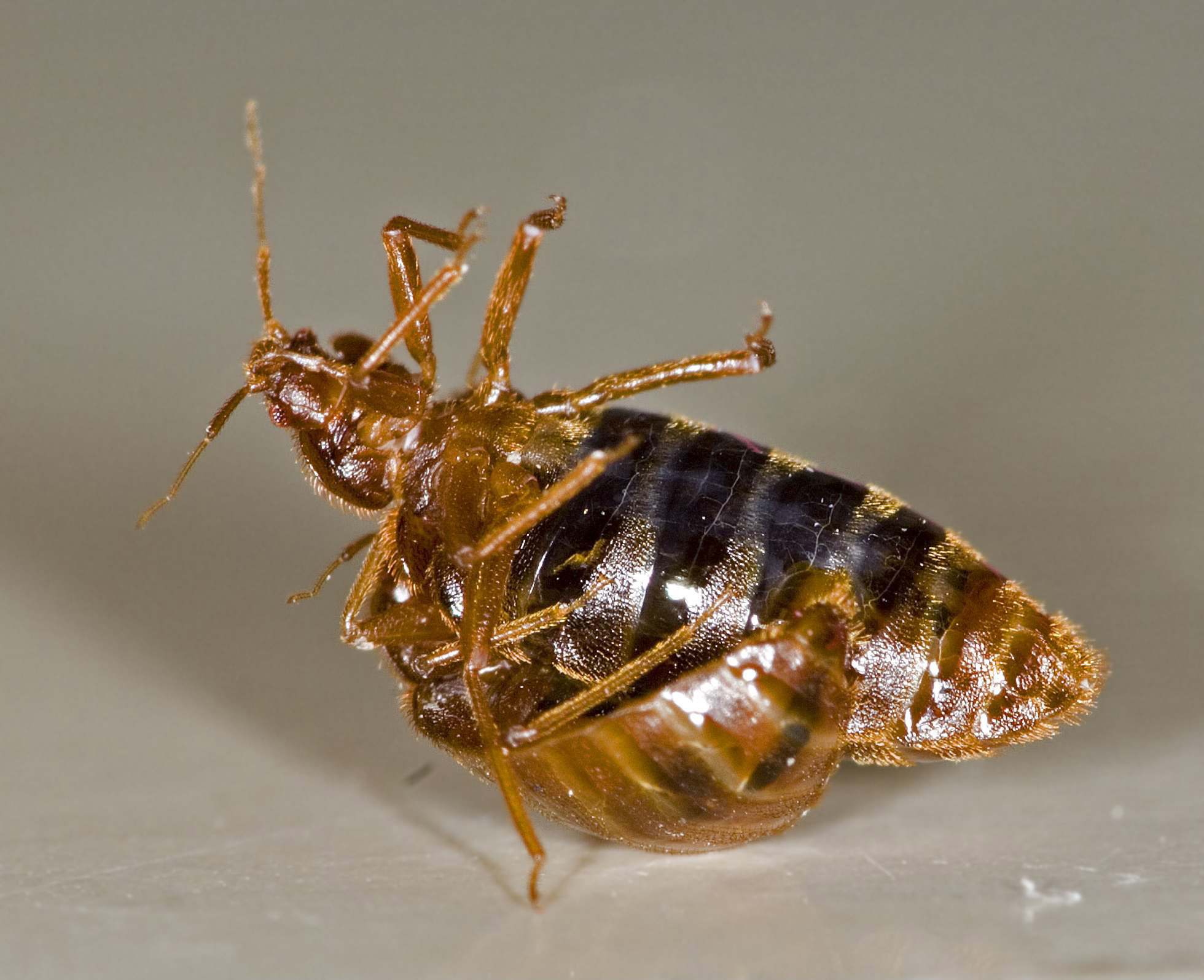
A male bed bug (Cimex lectularius) traumatically inseminates a female bed bug (top). The female's ventral carapace is visibly cracked around the point of insemination.

Traumatic insemination describes the male's tactics of piercing a female and depositing sperm in order to ensure paternity success. Traumatic insemination in this sense incorporates species which display extra-genitalic traumatic insemination. Males have a needle-like intromittent organ. Examples include bed bugs, bat bugs and spiders.

In bed bugs Cimex lectularius, for example, males initiate mating by climbing onto the female and piercing her abdomen. The male will then directly inject his sperm along with the accessory gland fluids into the female's blood. As a result, the female will have a distinct melanized scar in the region the male pierced. It was observed that males not only pierce females but also other males and nymphs. The females may suffer detrimental effects which can include blood leaking, wounds, the risk of infection, and the immune system having difficulty fighting off sperm in the blood.

A study focused on the mating effects of bed bugs of other species such as female Hesperocimex sonorensis and a male Hesperocimex cochimiensis. It was observed that H. sonorensis females died in a period of 24 to 48 hours after mating with H. cochimiensis males. When examining the females, it was evident that their abdomens were blackened and swollen due to an enormous number of immunoreactions. There is a direct relationship between the increase of mating and the decrease in female's lifespan.

Female bed bug mortality rate due to traumatic insemination could be related more to STDs rather than just the open wound. The same environmental microbes that were found on the male's genital were also found within the female. A study found a total of nine microbes, with five microbes actually causing mortality of females during copulation.

African bat bugs Afrocimex constrictus also perform extra-genitalic traumatic insemination. Males will puncture the female outside her genitals and ultimately inseminate them. It was observed that both males and females suffer from traumatic insemination. Males suffer from traumatic insemination because they expressed female like genitals, and were often at times mistaken for females. Females also displayed polymorphism because some females had distinct "female-like" genitals while others had a "male-like" appearance. The results showed that males along with females who had "male-like" genitals suffer less traumatic insemination compared to the distinct females. Female polymorphism could in fact be a result of evolution due to sexual conflict.

Male spiders Harpactea sadistica perform extra-genitalic traumatic insemination with their needle-like intromittent organs that puncture the female's wall, resulting in direct insemination. Males also puncture females with their cheliceral fangs during courtship. Females have atrophied spermathecae (sperm-storage organs). The sperm storage organ removes sperm from males who mate later, which reflects cryptic female choice. Cryptic female choice refers to a female's opportunity to choose with which sperm to fertilize her eggs. It has been suggested that males may have developed this aggressive mate tactic as a result of the female sperm storage organ.

=== Toxic semen ===
Toxic semen is most associated with Drosophila melanogaster fruit flies. Drosophila fruit flies exhibit toxic semen along with intra-genitalic traumatic insemination. The male places his intromittent organ within the female genitalia, following the piercing of her inner wall, to inject toxic semen.

Frequent mating in D. melanogaster is associated with a reduction in female lifespan. This cost of mating in D. melanogaster females is not due to receipt of sperm but is instead mediated by accessory gland proteins (Acps). Acps are found in male seminal fluid. The toxic effects of Acps on females may have evolved as a side effect of the other functions of Acps (e.g. male-male competition or increased egg production). Drosophila males may benefit from transferring toxic semen but it is not likely that their main reproductive benefit is directly from reducing female lifespan.

After Acps are transferred to the female, they cause various changes in her behavior and physiology. Studies have revealed that females who received Acps from males suffered decreased lifespan and fitness. Currently it has been estimated that there are more than 100 different Acps in D. melanogaster. Acp genes have been found in a variety of species and genera. Acps have been described as displaying a conservation function because they reserve protein biochemical classes within the seminal fluid.

Drosophila hibisci use mating plugs rather than traumatic insemination. The mating plugs of Drosophila hibisci are gelatinous, hard composites that adhere to the uterus of the female in the event of copulation. A study tested two hypotheses concerning mating plugs: a) that they were nutritional gifts for females to digest to provide maintenance of the eggs during maturation, or b) that they could serve as a chastity device to prevent sperm of rivals. The study found that mating plugs had no effect on female nutrition and serve as an enforcement device against rival males. Although this species of fruit flies (Drosophila hibisci) found success in mating plugs, they are ineffective for other Drosophila species. A study found that males who insert their mating plugs within females were unable to prevent females from remating just four hours after mating. Therefore, the assumption can be made that male Drosophila melanogaster develop other male adaptations to compensate for mating plug insufficiency, including intra-genitalic traumatic insemination to directly deposit their sperm.

=== Spiky genitals ===
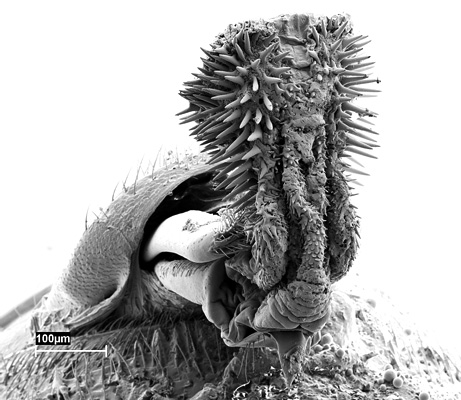
The penis of a Callosobruchus analis bean weevil. Some species of insect have evolved spiny penises, which damage the female reproductive tract. This has triggered an evolutionary arms race in which females use various techniques to resist being bred.

Bruchid beetle or bean weevil Callosobruchus maculatus males are known to express extra-genitalic traumatic insemination on females. The male Bruchid beetle's intromittent organ is described as having spines that are used to pierce the reproductive tract of the female.

Males which had multiple copulations with the same female caused greater damage to her genitals. However, those same males transferred a small quantity of ejaculate compared to the virgin males. It was also observed that males that participated in copulation with females sometimes deposit no sperm through the wounds they created on the females.

Females which mated with more than one male suffered higher mortality. Females had a decrease in longevity as a result of receiving a large single ejaculate from males. However, females which received a total of two ejaculates were less likely to die compared to those that received just one ejaculate. The assumption could be made that females that mated 48 hours after the first copulation were lacking nutrition as they do not drink or eat. The ejaculate that was provided after the second copulation was nutritionally beneficial and lengthened female longevity, allowing them to produce more offspring.

Females which mated with virgin males were less likely to suffer genital damage compared to those which mated with sexually experienced males. It was suggested that factors contributing to male virgins being less harmful were ejaculate size and the amount of sperm contained.

=== Love darts ===
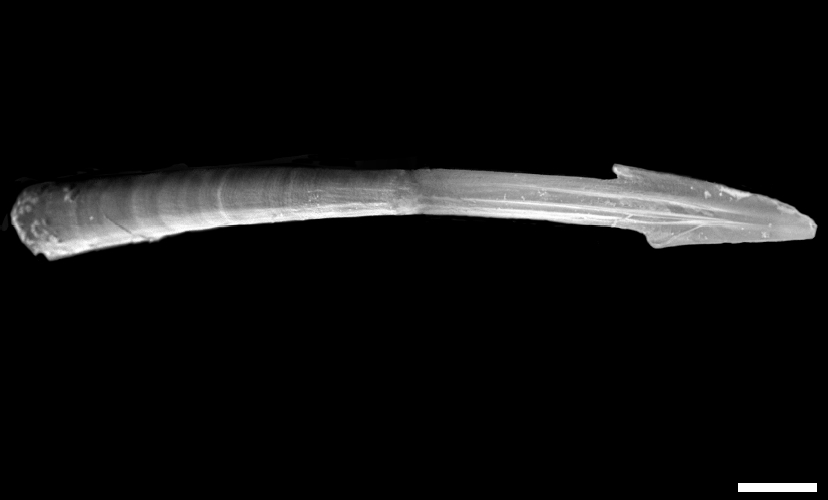
SEM image of lateral view of a love dart of the land snail Monachoides vicinus. The scale bar is 500 μm (0.5 mm).

Hermaphroditic gastropod snails mate using love darts. The love darts appear similar to a sharp "stiletto," created by the males. The love darts are shot at the females during courtship. A single love dart is shot at a time, due to the lengthy process of regeneration. Snails of the genus Helix are model organisms for the study of love darts. It was observed that snails that rub against their mates, will forcefully place the love dart into their mate. It has been shown that though darts may aid in mating, they do not necessarily ensure mating success. However, love darts do in fact aid in mating success. Hermaphroditic snails will selectively take on a female or male role. Snails transmitted darts into these females so that they would store more sperm (about twice as much) compared to males who were not as successful. Males who successfully hit females with love darts had higher paternity assurance. Many snails inflicted with love darts suffer open wounds and sometimes death.

=== Forced copulation ===
Forced copulation (sexual coercion) by males occurs in a wide range of species and may elicit behaviors such as aggression, harassment and grasping. In the time prior to or during copulation, females suffer detrimental effects due to forceful male mating tactics. Ultimately, females are forced to copulate against their will.

==== Harassment ====
Harassment is a behavior displayed during or prior to forced copulation. A male may follow the female at a distance in preparation to attack. In the Malabar ricefish Horaichthys setnai (Beloniformes), males harass females of interest from a distance. This behavior may consist of swimming below or behind the females, and even following them at a distance. When the male Malabar ricefish is ready to copulate, he dashes at high speed towards the female and release his club-shaped organ, the gonopodium also known as an anal fin. The purpose of the gonopodium is to deliver the spermatophore. The male takes his gonopodium and forcefully places it near the female genitalia. The sharp end of the spermatophore stabs the female's skin. As a result, the male is firmly attached to the female. Following this event, the male's spermatophore bursts, releasing sperm that travel towards the female's genital opening.

==== Grasping ====
Forced copulation can lead to aggressive behaviors such as grasping. Males express grasping behaviors during the event of copulation with a desired female. Darwin (1871) described males with grasping qualities as having "organs for prehension." His view was that males perform these aggressive behaviors in order to prevent the female from leaving or escaping. The purpose of male grasping devices is to increase the duration of copulation along with restricting females from other males. Grasping traits can also be considered as a way of males expressing mate-guarding. Examples of species with grasping traits are water striders, diving beetles, and the dung fly Sepsis cynipsea.

During forced copulation, male water striders (genus Gerris) attack females. As a result, a struggle occurs because the female is resistant. When the male water strider is successfully attached to the female, the female carries the male during and after copulation. This can be energetically costly to the female because she has to support the heavy weight of the male at the same time as she is gliding on the water surface. The speed of the female is usually reduced by 20% when the male is attached. The purpose of long copulation is for the male to achieve paternity assurance in order to restrict the female from other males. Long periods of copulation can strongly affect females because females will depart from the water surface after mating and discontinue foraging. The duration of copulation can be extremely long. For water strider Aquarius najas it was a total of 3 months. For water strider Gerris lateralis the time ranged from 4 to 7 minutes.

In water strider Gerris odontogaster, males have an abdominal clasping mechanism that grasps females in highly complex struggles before mating. Males that have clasps that are longer than those of other males were able to endure more somersaults by resistant females and achieved mating success. Males' genital structures had a particular shape to aid in female resistance.

Water striders G. gracilicornis have a behavioral mechanism and grasping structures allowing grasping. Male water striders use what is called an "intimidating courtship". This mechanism involves males using a signal vibration to attract predators in order to manipulate females to mate. Females face more risks of being captured by predators since they idle on the water's surface for long periods of time. If a male were attached to the female, it would be less likely for the male to be harmed by the predators because he would be resting on top of the female. Therefore, males will tap their legs in order to create ripples in the water to attract predators. The female become fearful, causing her to be less resistant towards the male. As a result, copulation occurs faster, during which the male stops signaling.

Male water striders Gerris odontogaster have grasping structures that can prolong copulation depending on the size of their abdominal processes. Males who had longer abdominal processes were able to restrain females longer than males who had shorter abdominal processes.

In diving beetles Dytiscidae, males approach females in the water with a grasping mechanism before copulation. When this occurs, females repeatedly resist. Males evolved an anatomical advantage towards grasping. Males have a particular structure located on their tarsae that enhances grasping of female anatomical structures, pronotum and elytra, which are located on her dorsal surface.

Sepsis cynipsea is another example of sexual conflict via grasping. Males cannot force copulation; however, while females lay eggs fertilized from a previous mating, a new male mounts the female and guards her from other males. Although the females are larger than the males, the males are still able to grasp onto a female. Females are also known to attempt to shake off the male from her back. If she does not shake him off successfully, they mate.

=== Sexual cannibalism ===
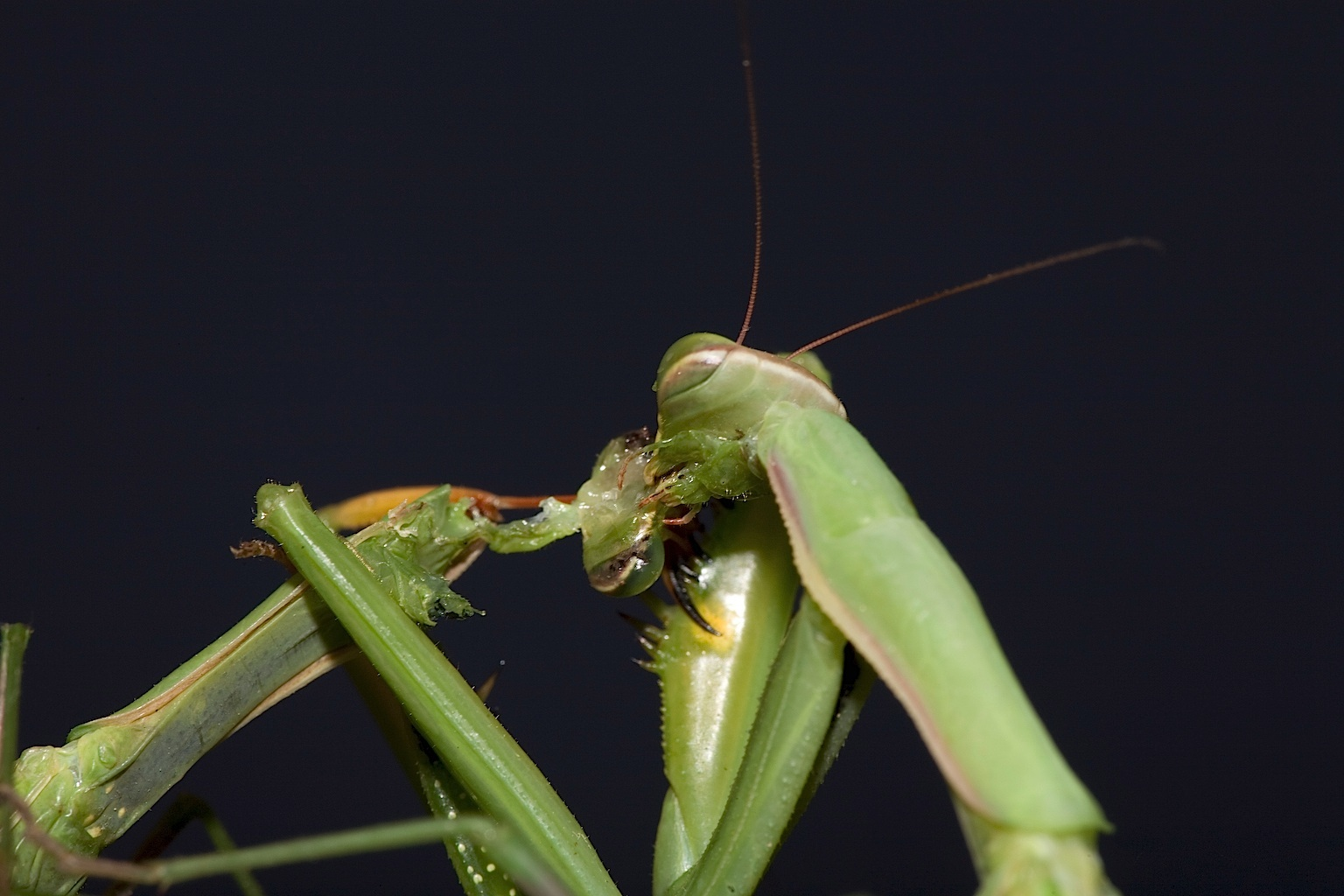
Sexual cannibalism in praying mantises: a female biting off the head of a male

Sexual cannibalism contradicts the traditional male-female relationship in terms of sexual conflict. Sexual cannibalism involves females slaying and consuming males during attempted courtship or copulation, as in the interaction between male and female funnel-web spider (Hololena curta).

A possible explanation for sexual cannibalism occurring across taxa is "paternal investment". This means that females kill and consume males, sometimes after sperm exchange, in order to enhance the quality and number of her offspring. Male consumption by females serves as a blood meal since they volunteer their soma. The idea of "paternal investment" supports the concept of female choice because female spiders consume males in order to receive an increase in quality of offspring. Males may tap into female sensory biases that may influence female mate selection. Male gift-giving spiders are known to provide gifts to females in order to avoid being eaten. This is a tactic that males may use in order to manipulate females to not kill them. Females may have a strong, uncontrollable appetite, which males may use to their advantage by manipulating females through edible gifts.

=== Antiaphrodisiac ===
Males of several species of Heliconius butterflies, such as Heliconius melpomene and Heliconius erato, have been found to transfer an antiaphrodisiac to the female during copulation. This compound is only produced in the male and is how males identify one another as male. Therefore, when it is transferred to the female, she then smells like a male. This prevents future males from attempting to copulate with her. This behavior both benefits the female because harassment from males post mating has been found to decrease reproductive success by disturbing the production of eggs, and increases the reproductive success of the male by ensuring that his sperm will be used to fertilize the egg.

== Sexual conflict after mating ==
The most well known examples of sexual conflict occur before and during mating, but conflicts of interest do not end once mating has happened. Initially there may be a conflict over female reproductive patterns such as reproductive rate, remating rate, and sperm utilization. In species with parental care, there may be a conflict over which sex provides care and the amount of care given to the offspring.

=== Cryptic female choice ===
Cryptic female choice falls under the conflict in reproductive patterns. Cryptic female choice results from process that occurs after intromission which allows the female to preferentially fertilize or produce offspring with a particular male phenotype. It is thought that if the female's cryptic choice provides her with indirect genetic benefits in the form of more fit offspring, any male phenotype that limits female cryptic choice will induce a cost on the female. Often, cryptic female choice occurs in polyandrous or polygamous species.

The cricket species, Gryllus bimaculatus, is a polygamous species. Multiple matings increases the hatching success of clutch of eggs which is hypothesized to be a result of increased chances of finding compatible sperm. Therefore, it is in the female's best interest to mate with multiple males to increase the offspring genetic fitness; however, males would prefer to sire more of the females' offspring and will try to prevent the female from having multiple matings by mate guarding to exclude rival males.

Similarly, the polyandrous species of spider Pisaura mirabilis has been demonstrated to have cryptic female choice. The presence of a nuptial gift by a male increases the proportion of sperm retained by the female (With copulation duration controlled for).

=== Parental care ===
Parental investment is when either parent cares for eggs or offspring resulting in increased offspring fitness. Though intuitively one might assume that since providing care to offspring would provide indirect genetic benefits to both parents, there would not be much sexual conflict; however, since neither is interested in the other's genetic fitness, it is more beneficial to be selfish and push the costs of parental care onto the other sex. Therefore, each partner would exert selection on the other partner to provide more care, creating sexual conflict. Additionally, since it is beneficial for one partner to develop adaptations in parental care at the expense of the other, the other partner is likely to evolve counter adaptations to avoid being exploited, creating a situation to be predicted by game theory.

In the species Nicrophorus defodiens, the burying beetle, there is biparental care; however, males of the species will resume releasing pheromones after mating with the primary female in order to attract more females to increase his reproductive output. However, it is in the female's best interest if she can monopolize the male's parental care and food providence for her offspring. Therefore, the female will bite and attempt to push the male off his signaling perch and interfere with the male's secondary mating attempts in order to impose monogamy on the male.

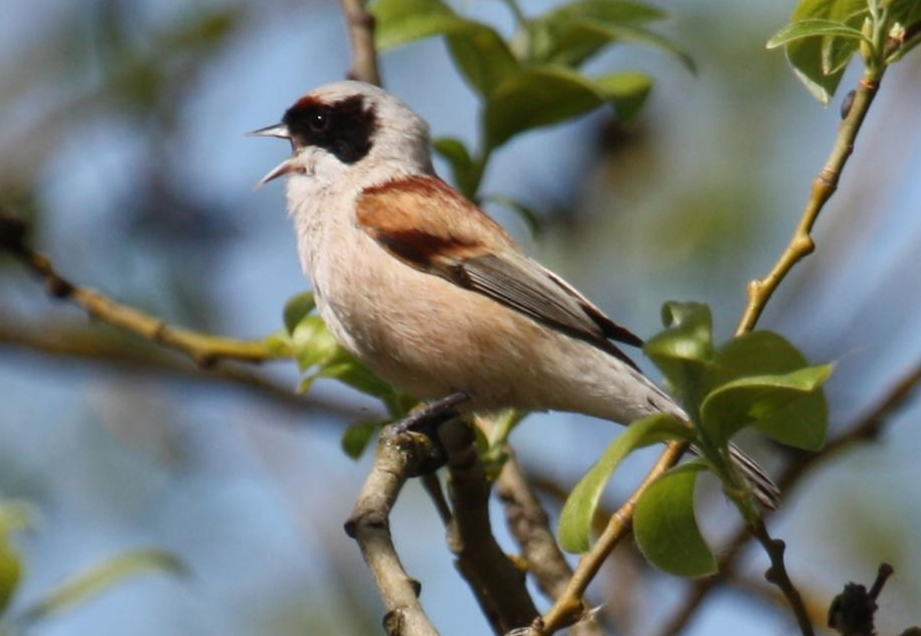
A singing Eurasian penduline tit

In Remiz pendulinus, the Eurasian penduline tit, the male will build an elaborate nest and may or may not be joined by a female at any stage of construction. After eggs are laid, it is strictly uniparental incubation and offspring care; however, either parent may take the role of caregiver. Females will give care 50-70% of initiated breedings while males will give care 5-20% of the time, and approximately 30%-35% of the time, the eggs, which consist of four to five viable eggs, will be left to die, which is a considerable cost to both parents. However, being deserted also represents a large cost for the deserted parent. Therefore, timing of desertion becomes very important. Optimal timing for the males depends on the status of the clutch, and as a result the male frequently enters and remains near the nest during the egg-laying period. For females it is important not to desert too early so that the male does not also desert the eggs, but also not too late else the male deserts before the female does. Females adapt by being very aggressive towards males that try to approach the nest as well as hiding one or more eggs so that males do not have full information on the clutch status.

Breeding success of Eurasian penduline tits suggests conflicting interests between males and females in a wild population: by deserting the clutch each parent increases her (or his) reproductive success although desertion reduces the reproductive success of their mate. This tug-of-war between males and females over care provisioning has been suggested to drive flexible parenting strategies in this species. In the closely related Cape penduline tit Anthoscopus minutus, however, both parents incubate the eggs and rear the young. A contributing factor to parenting decision is extra-pair paternity since in Cape penduline tit less than 8% of young were extra-pair whereas in Eurasian penduline tit over 24% young resulted from extra-pair paternity.

In other species such as the Guianan cock-of-the-rock, as well as other lekking species, sexual conflict may not even manifest itself in parental care. The females of these species have the tendency to select males to mate with, become fertilized, and the females raise the offspring on their own in their nests.

== See also ==
- Concealed ovulation
- Extra-pair copulation
- Genomic imprinting
- Intragenomic conflict
- Parent–offspring conflict
- Red Queen hypothesis
- Sexual conflict in humans
- Sexual dimorphism
