= Mate poaching =

Mate poaching may refer to:

- Human mate poaching
- Mate poaching in animals

== See also ==
- Mate guarding in humans
