= Seminal fluid protein =

Non-sperm component of semen

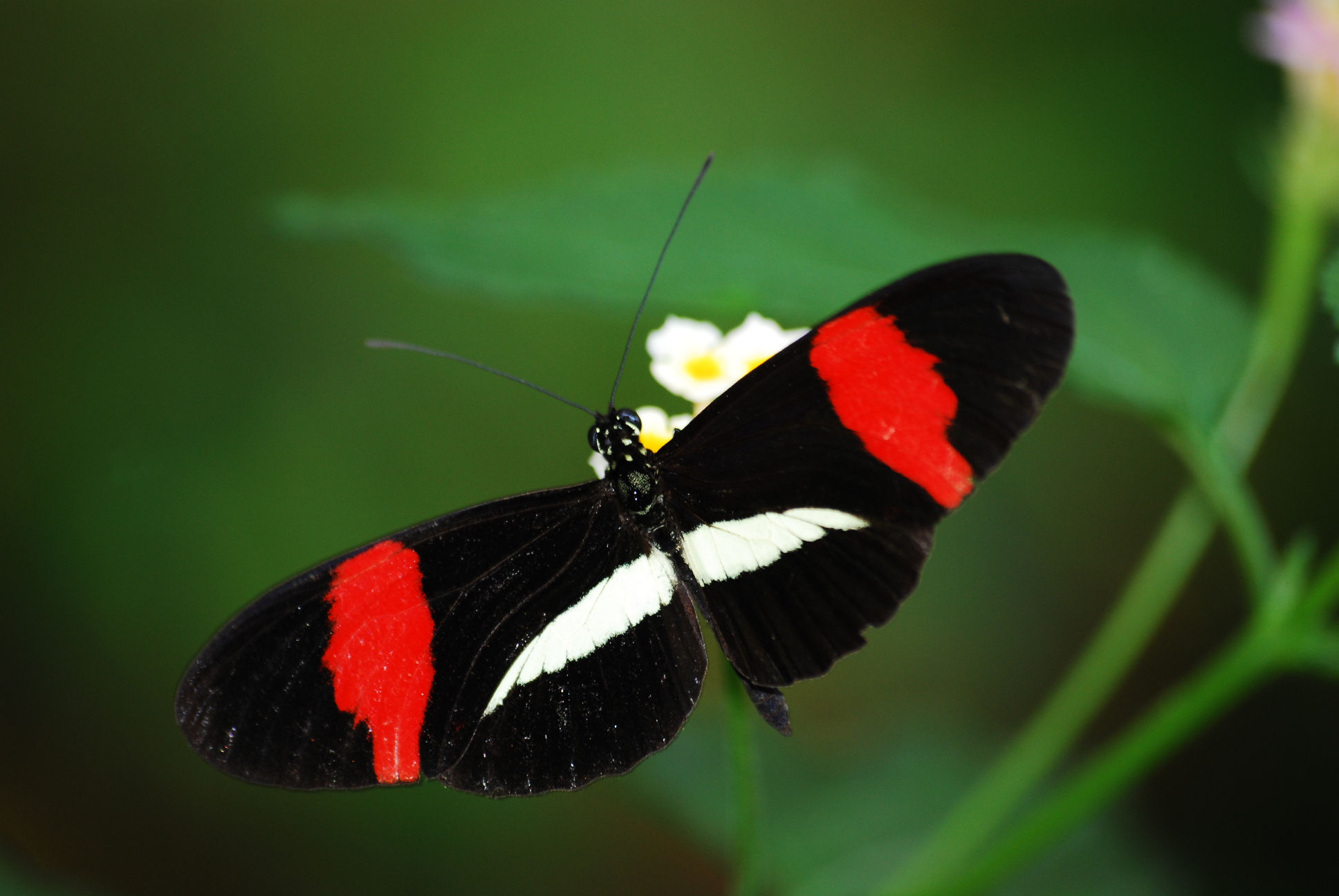
Heliconius erato, or the red postman, was among the first species of butterfly to have its seminal fluid proteome studied.

Seminal fluid proteins (SFPs), or accessory gland proteins (Acps), are one of the non-sperm components of semen. In many animals with internal fertilization, males transfer a complex cocktail of proteins in their semen to females during copulation. These seminal fluid proteins often have diverse, potent effects on female post-mating phenotypes. SFPs are produced by the male accessory glands.

Seminal fluid proteins frequently show evidence of elevated evolutionary rates and are often cited as an example of sexual conflict.

== Proteomics ==
SFPs are best studied in mammals and insects, especially in the common fruit fly, Drosophila melanogaster. Most species produce a wide variety of proteins that are transferred to females. For example, approximately 290 SFPs have been identified in D. melanogaster, 46 in the mosquito Anopheles gambae, and around 160 in humans.

== Elevated evolution ==
Even between closely related species, the seminal fluid proteome can vary greatly. SFPs show elevated rates of DNA sequence change compared to non-reproductive genes (measured by K_{a}/K_{s} ratio) in many orders, including Diptera (flies), Lepidoptera (butterflies and moths), Rodentia, and Primates.

Additionally, SFPs show high rates of gene turnover compared to non-reproductive genes.

== Function ==
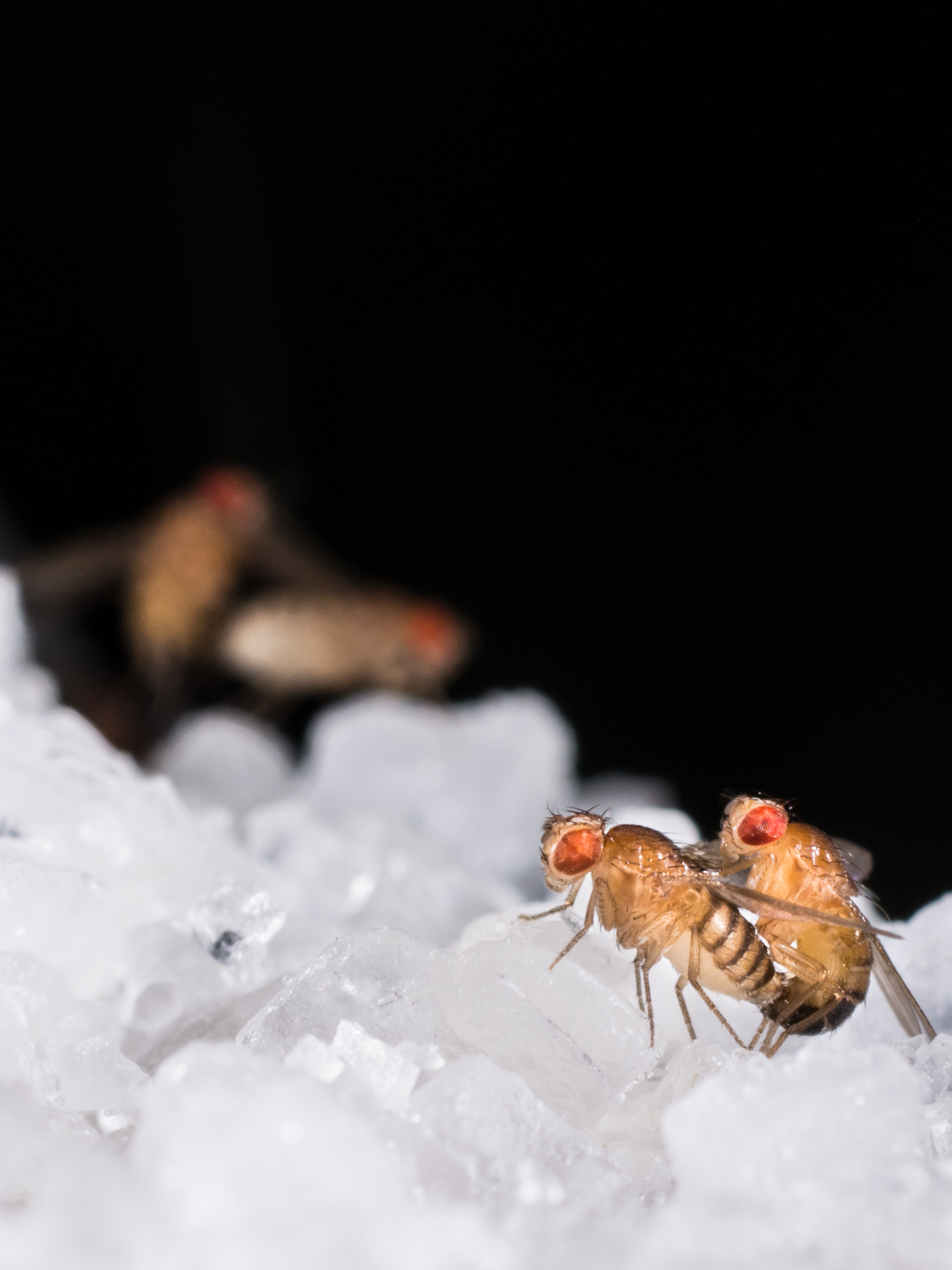
Research on the function of SFPs has been conducted primarily in insect species, especially D. melanogaster.

The function of SFPs is best understood in D. melanogaster. SFPs play a role in male–male sperm competition. One study that manipulated the amount of SFPs male D. melanogaster produced found that when males were in competition, males that produced more SFPs sired a larger proportion of offspring. Many D. melanogaster SFP genes are expressed by the female reproductive tract, particularly within the sperm storage organs, which may be more consistent with roles supporting spermatozoa than in sexual conflict.

In many insect species, significant changes occur in female behavior and physiology following mating; the isolated receipt of SFPs has been shown to be responsible for many of these changes. In D. melanogaster females, over 160 genes show either up or down-regulation following isolated SFP receipt. These transcriptomic changes are not limited to the female's reproductive tract. SFPs lengthen the refractory period (when the female is disinterested in mating) and stimulate ovulation; additionally they can affect processes such as sperm storage, metabolism, and activity levels.

Though SFPs seem to play a role in coordinating male and female reproductive efforts (e.g. in timing of ovulation), SFPs may also be a source of sexual conflict. Studies of D. melanogaster have revealed that females who received SFPs suffered decreased lifespan and fitness. Frequent mating in D. melanogaster is associated with a reduction in female lifespan, and this cost of mating in females has been shown to be primarily mediated by receipt of SFPs.

As SFPs play an important role in reproductive processes in disease-carrying species of mosquito and additionally tend to be highly species-specific, manipulation of SFPs may hold potential for highly targeted control of these mosquito populations.
