= W. S. Bristowe =

English naturalist and authority on spiders (1901–1979)

William Syer Bristowe
- Born: 1 September 1901
- Died: 11 January 1979 (aged 78)
- Citizenship: United Kingdom
- Education: Wellington College; Cambridge University
- Known for: Spiders; Discovering the true story of Anna Leonowens
- Scientific career
- Fields: Arachnologist
- Workplaces: Imperial Chemical Industries

William Syer Bristowe (1 September 1901 – 11 September 1979), who wrote under the name W. S. Bristowe, was an English naturalist, a prolific and popular scientific writer and authority on spiders. He was educated at Wellington College and Cambridge University and in 1921 went on a Cambridge University expedition to Jan Mayen led by James Mann Wordie. Two years later he went on another Cambridge University expedition, this time to Brazil.

Bristowe was employed by Brunner Mond which subsequently became Imperial Chemical Industries (ICI). In 1936, he was appointed head of the ICI Far East Department, later managing ICI Central Staff Department from 1948 to 1962.

Late in his life he also had an unexpected but important role in discovering the true story of Anna Leonowens, the 19th century woman whose memoirs inspired a number of dramatic and fictional works, most notably the musical The King and I. Leonowens presented her own account as factual and it was accepted in the west as such, despite being strongly disputed in Thailand. In the 1970s, when Bristowe, a regular visitor to the far east in search of spiders, was researching a biography of Leonowen's son, Louis T. Leonowens, he discovered and published evidence that significant parts of the tale were in fact fictional.

== Bibliography ==
(incomplete)

- Comity of Spiders (two volumes published in 1939 and 1941)
- A Book of Spiders. King Penguin No. 35, W. S. Bristowe, King Penguin, 1947
- World of Spiders, W. S. Bristowe, Collins New Naturalist, Nov 1958, ISBN 0-8008-8598-8
- A Book of Islands, W. S. Bristowe, G. Bell & Sons London, 1969 ISBN 0-7135-1529-5
- Louis and the King of Siam, W. S. Bristowe, Chatto & Windus, 1976, ISBN 0-7011-2164-5
