= Christian Drewsen =

Danish paper manufacturer and amateur entomologist

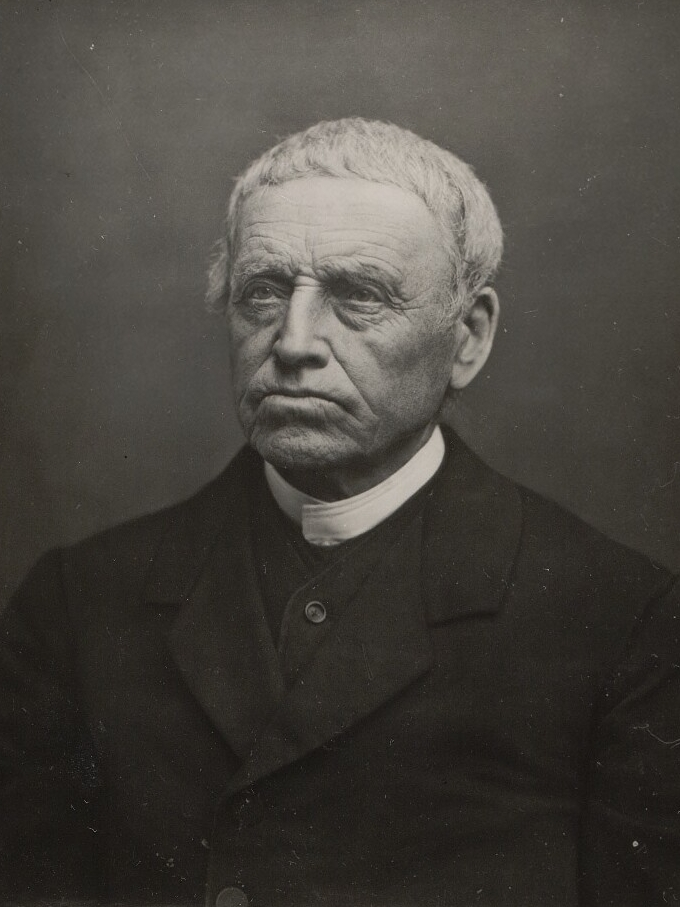

Christian Drewsen (30 August 1799 – 2 June 1896) was a Danish paper manufacturer, amateur entomologist and insect collector. Along with his brother he inherited the family business of the Strandmøllen paper mill, In his spare time he studied the local insects and collected specimens from around the world, and donated them to the Copenhagen University's Zoological Museum.

Drewsen was born in Strandmøllen to paper mill owner Johan Christian and Johanne Ophelia Rosing. He worked for his father's business and later managed an oil mill in Skodsborg. After the father resigned in 1844, he and his brother Michael managed the paper factory at Strandmøllen and acquired more paper factories. In 1899 the factories were sold to United Paper Mills. He took an interest in the history of Danish paper manufacture in later life. He had an interest in entomology and began to collected insect specimens from a wide network. Among his findings was the parasitic relationship of mutillids in bumble bee nests. In 1830 he met J. C. Schiødte while on a collecting trip and became a close associate. Drewsen became an advisor for Schiødte's research. When Schiødte began a natural history journal, Drewsen supplied free paper for its printing.
