= Overgaden Oven Vandet 20 =

Canal house in central Copenhagen, Denmark

Overgaden Oven Vandet 52
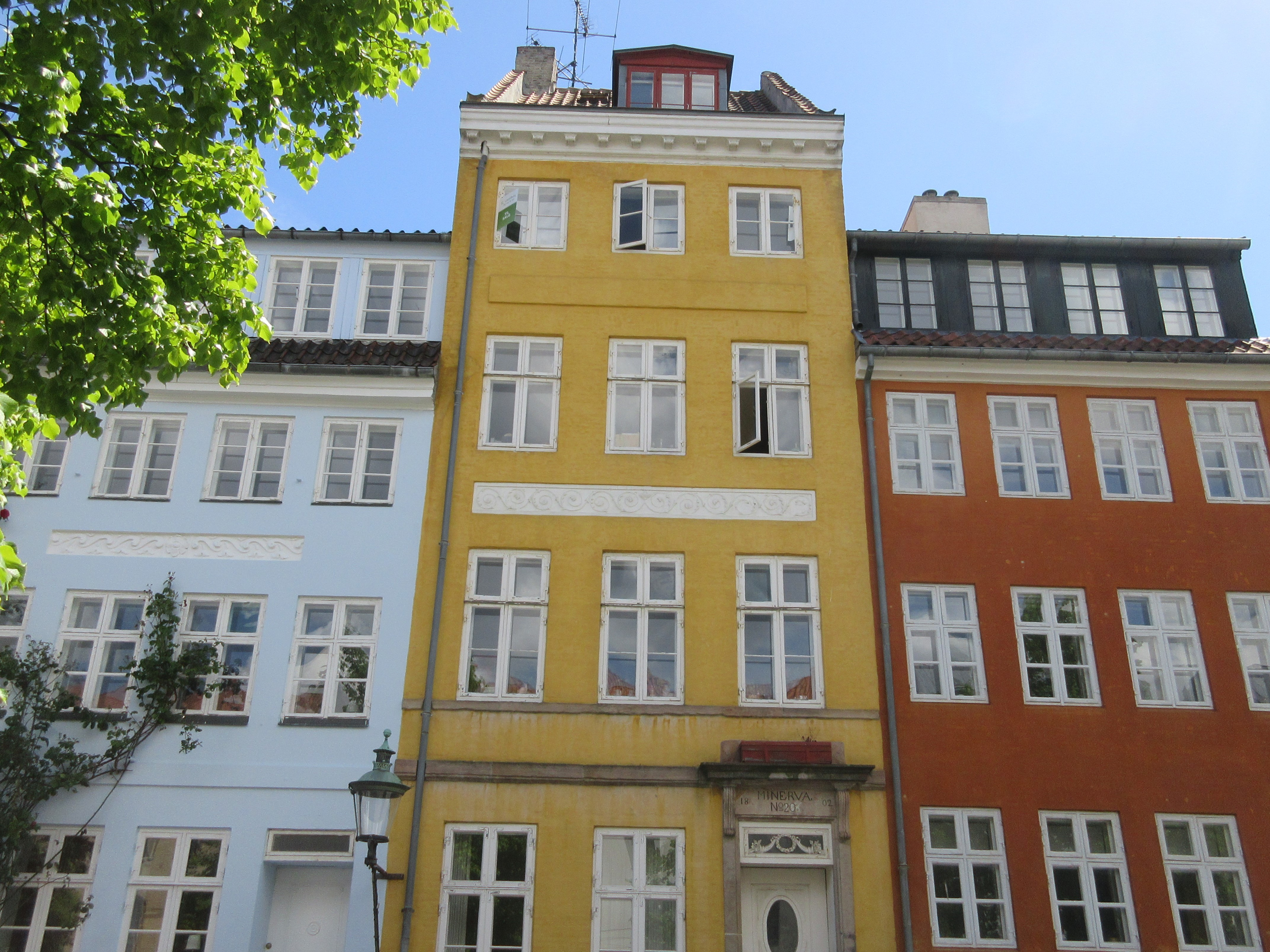
- Interactive map of the Overgaden Oven Vandet 52 area

General information
- Location: Copenhagen, Denmark
- Coordinates: 55°40′15.74″N 12°35′20.51″E
- Completed: 11802

Overgaden Oven Vamdet 20 is a canal house overlooking Christianshavn Canal in the Christianshavn neighborhood of central Copenhagen, Denmark. Built for a former ship captain in 1802, it stands four storeys tall and just three bays wide. It was listed in the Danish registry of protected buildings and places inn 1918. Notable former residents include the zoologist Jørgen Matthias Christian Schiødte.

== History ==
=== 17th and 18th centuries ===
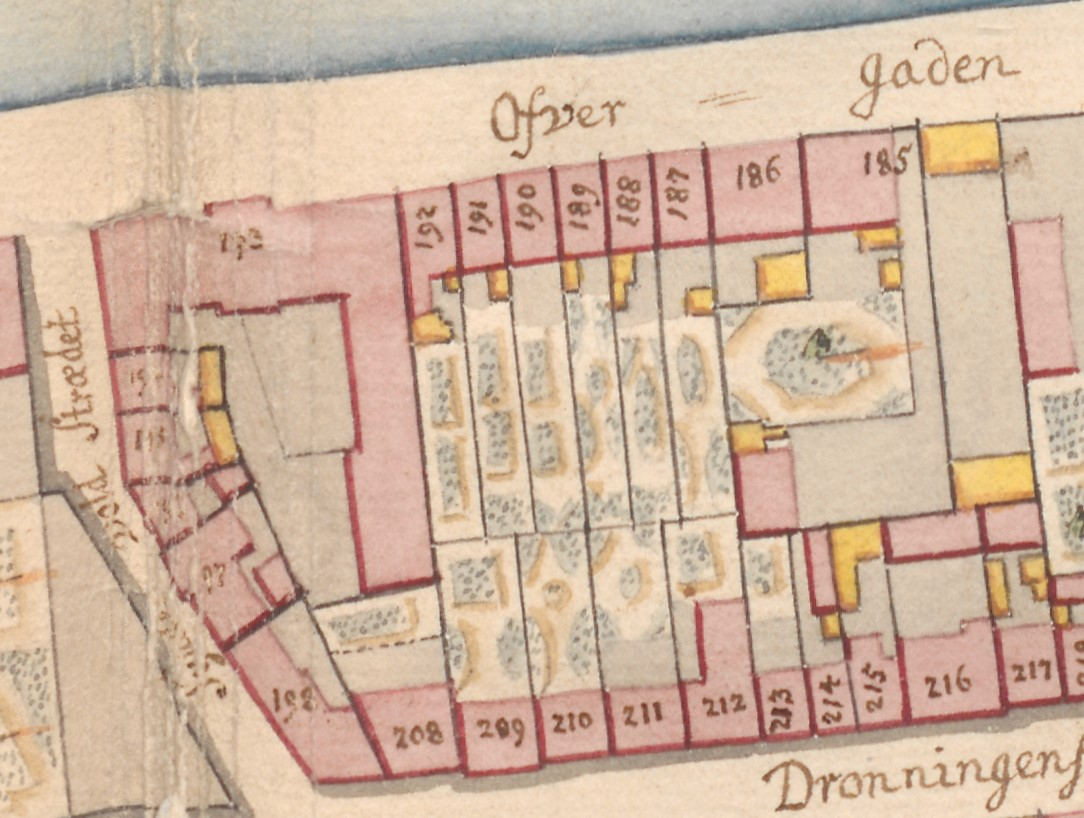
No. 188 seen on a detail from Christian Gedde's map of Christianshavn Quarter, 1757.

The site was originally part of a large Lot, No. 37, comprising presen-day Overgaden Oven Vandet –22 and Dronningensgade 9–15, which was ceded to renteskriver Anders Olufsen. By 1635, it had been built over with low rows of tenement houses towards both streets. By 167 the house row along the canal had been adapted into six more prominent townhouses. The houses were timberframed, two storeys tall and four bays wide, with brick basements and adjoining gables. The main entrances were arranged in pairs under a shared gabled wall dormer. The houses were over time subject to various changes. The half-timbered facades were reconstructed in brick and the buildings were also heightened. The houses were owned by skippers and came with a private berth along the quay.

The property now known as Overgaden Oven Vandet 20 was listed in Copenhagen's first cadastre from 1689 as No. 107 in Christianshavn Quarter. It was at that time owned by former boatman Jens Pedersen. It was listed as No. 188 in the new cadastre of 1756 and was at that time owned by skipper Henrik Scherling.

The property was home to five residents in two households at the 1787 census. Cathrine Marie Larsen, a 57-year-old widow, resided in the building with two daughters (aged 28 and 31). Peter Larsen, a concierge, resided in the building with his wife Margrethe Hansdatter.

=== Peter Hansen Kock and the new building ===
In 1800, No. 188 was acquired by Waterschout Peter Hansen Koch (1745–1817). Kock was originally from Flensburg. He had for many years worked for some of the large trading houses in Christianshavn, including Tutein and Iselin & Co. He had served as captain on 16 voyages to the Danish West Indies, some of them with slaves from the Danish Gold Coast. Back in 1787, he had resided with his family at No. 179 in Christianshavn (now part of Overgaden oven Vandet 44–46). In 1795, he was appointed as Waterschout in Copenhagen. He had the same year acquired Overgaden Oven Vandet 12-14 but sold it again later the same year. In 1797, he became the owner of Overgaden Oven Vandet 22 (then No. 187) through his marriage to the widow of the previous owner.

Peter Hansen Kock was still residing in his old property (No. 187) at the time of the 1801 census. He lived there with his wife Anne Olsdatter, the 18-year-old sailor Hans Tiesen, 14-year-old Mette Kirstine Andersen, a five-year-old boy from the Danish West Indies named Peter Friemann and two maids. At the time of his confirmation, Peter Friemann was called Peter Kock and referred to as Peter Hansen Kock's "adopted son". The name "Frimann" (lit. "Free Man") indicates that he could be the son of a freed slave. Alternatively, he could be Kock's own son by a slave in the Danish West Indies. Kock's new property (No. 188) was home to 16 residents in four households at the 1801 census. Hans Dyresen, an innkeeper, resided in the building with his wife Anne Marie Olsdatter. Henrich Haldsen, a turner, resided in the building with his wife Bente Andreasdatter and the wife's 21-year-old sister Christine Andersdatter. Peter Sørensen, a workman, resided in the building with his wife Anne Olsdatter, their three foster children (aged one to four) and two lodgers (ship carpenter and smith). Christian Larsen, another workman, resided in the building with his wife Else Truelsdatter and their two children (aged four and seven).

In 1802, Kock demolished the building at No. 188 and replaced it with the present building on the site. His property was listed as No. 102 in the new cadastre of 1806.

=== 1817–1899 ===
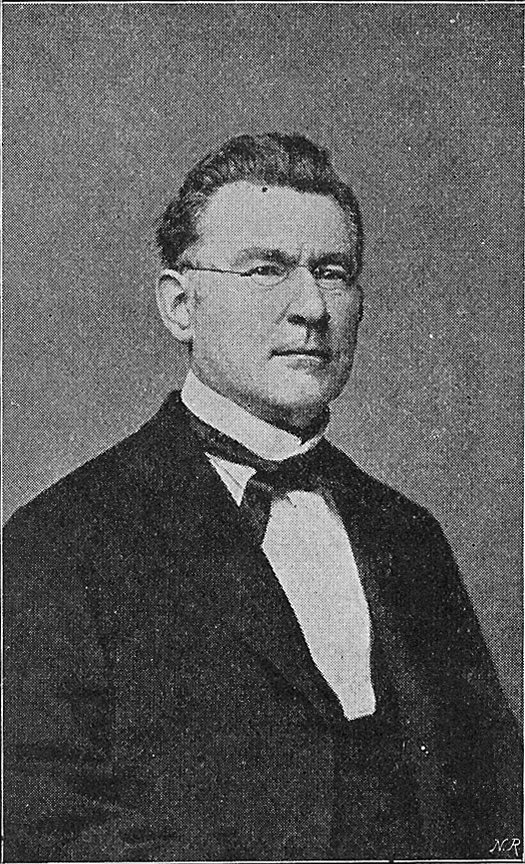
Jørgen Matthias Christian Schiødte

In 1817, Koch's heirs sold the property to ship captain Søren Jensen Høyer (c. 1773–1818). Hæyer was originally from Ravsted at Åbenrå. In 1798, he had passed the captain's exam in Copenhagen. Høyer served as officer onboard some of the last slave ships to the Danish West Indies before and after the official Danish ban of slave transports in 1803. In 1800, he was promoted from 1st helmsman (førstestyrmand) to captain of Jens Lind's frigate Martha Magdalena on a voyage to the Danish Gold Coast following the death of captain C.J. Lind. He later served as captain of the same ship on three more voyages to the Danish Gold Coast in 1803, 1804 and 1806, He also served as captain on five voyages to the Danish West Indies, two with Håbet in 1806–07 and three with Janus in 1814–16. He died just one year after buying the property in Overgaden. His widow kept the property until 1821.

The zoologist Jørgen Matthias Christian Schiødte (1815–1884) was a resident of the building in 1841-1842 and again from 1844 to 1850.

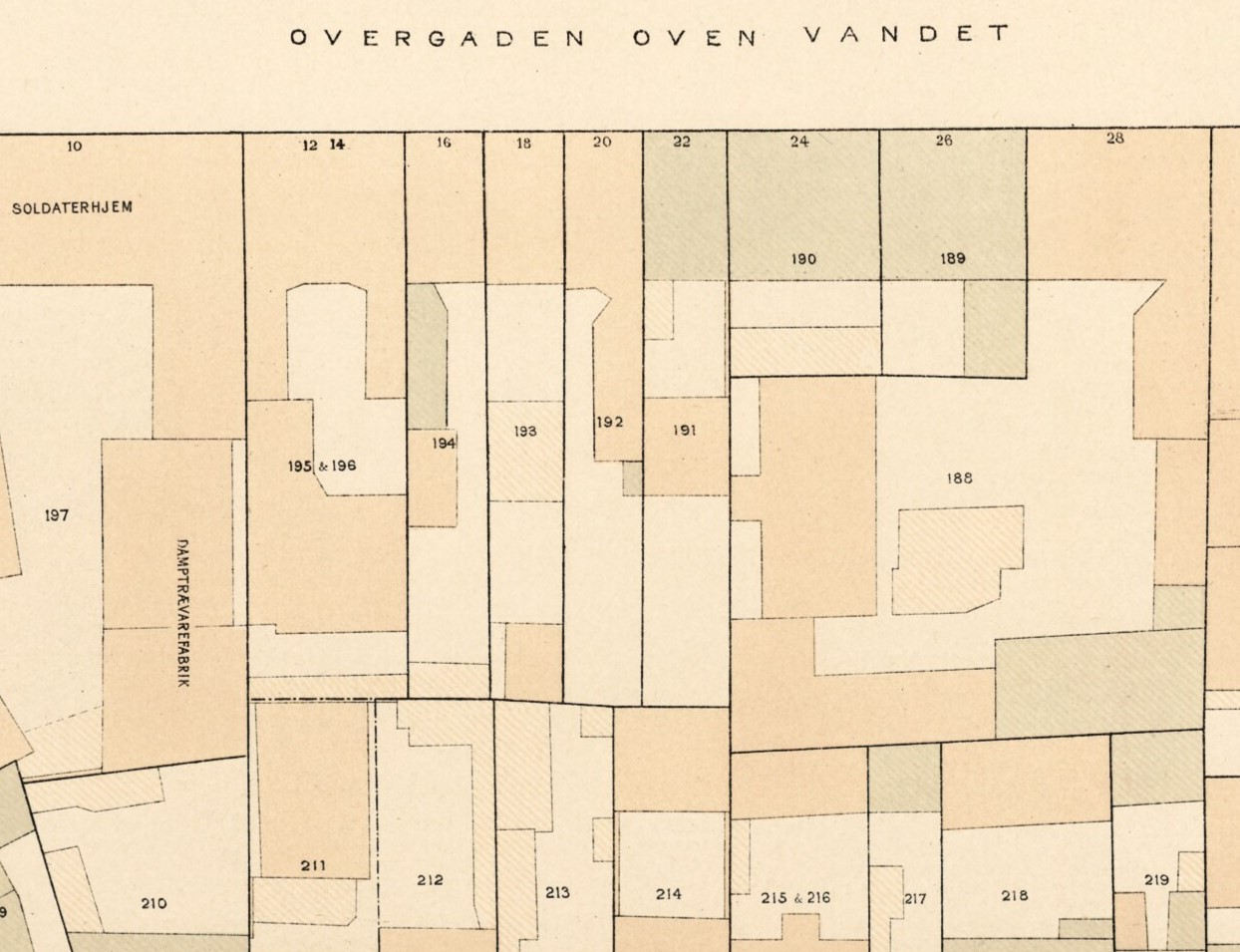
Overgaden Oven Vandet 20 seen on a detail from one of Berggreen's block plans of Christianshavn, 1886–88.

The property was home to 21 residents at the 1860 census. Niels Andersen Hamborg, a broker (Vexelmægler), resided on the ground floor with his wife Emilie Augusta (née Møller) and their five children (aged 13 to 30). Johannes Petersen, a helmsman, resided on the first floor with his wife Hansine (née Thaarigaard), their two daughters (aged two and nine) and one maid. Chatrine Hansen (née Petersen), a 50-year-old widow grocer (urtekræmmer), resided on the second floor with her daughters Emma Christine Marie Hansen (18) and Anna Simonine Harieth Hansen (16) as well as the eldest daughter's fiancé Johan Christian Frederik Breininger (30, helmsman). Anna Maria Tikiøb, a widow, resided on the third floor with three of her children (aged 24 to 35), her sister Nancy Smith and one maid.

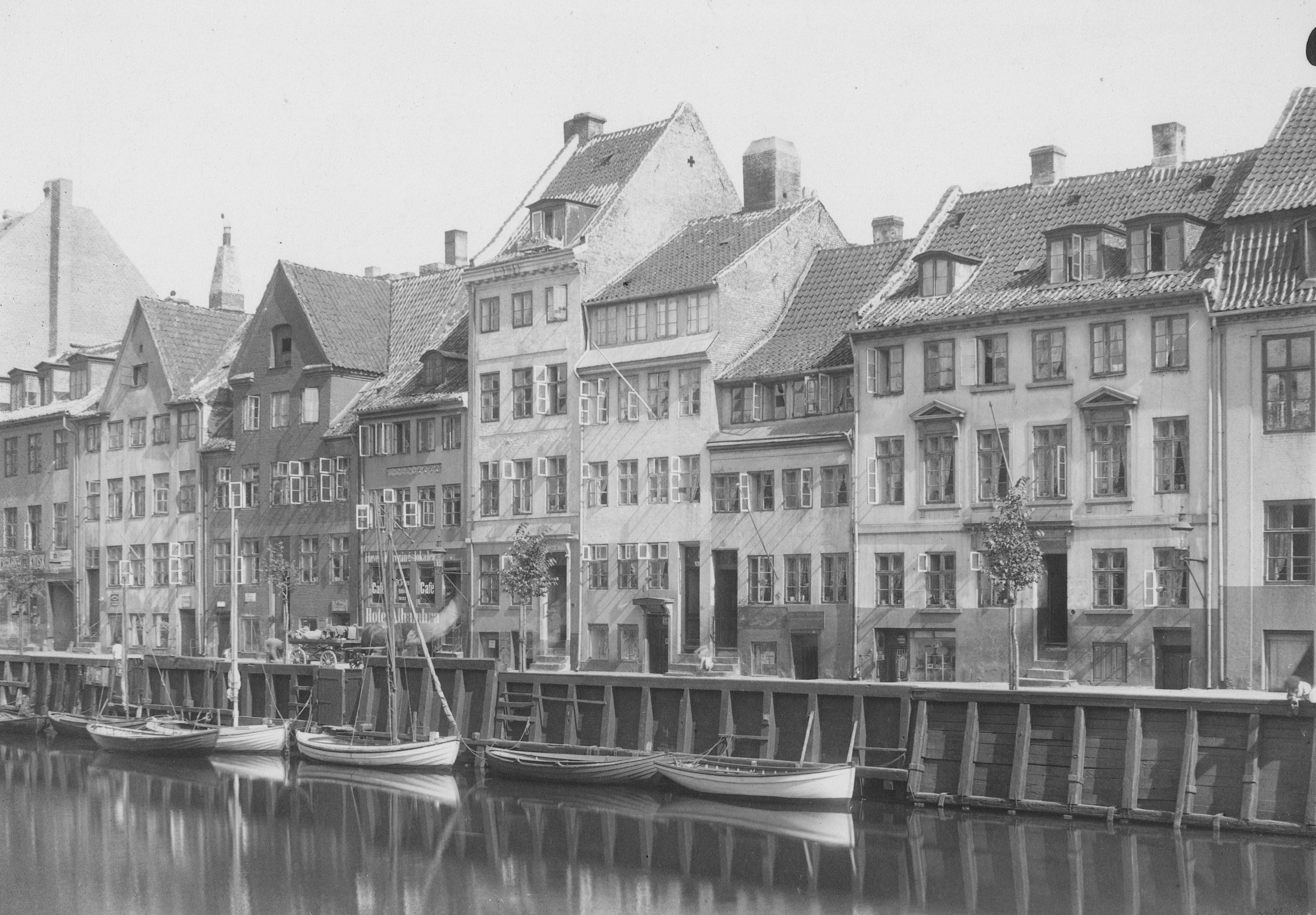
The building in c. 1900.

The property was home to 19 residents at the 1880 census. Jens Jacobsen, a worker at Burmeister & Wain, resided on the ground floor with his wife Birthe Maria Jacobsen, three orphaned nieces and two lodgers. Villiam Alexander Tikiøb, Anna Maria Tikiøb's eldest son (cf. the 1850 census), now a manager of the Phoenix Sugar Factory, resided on the first floor with his wife Caroline Marie Tikiøb, his brother's widow Martine Jubeline Tikiøb and one maid. Adam Peter Cahnbleg, a tanner, resided on the second floor with his sister Hansine Birgitte Cahnbleg. Andreas Christian Thorvald Hansen, a worker in Løwener's Iron Foundry, resided on the third floor with his wife Anna Christine Hansen and their two daughters (aged two and seven).

=== 20th century ===
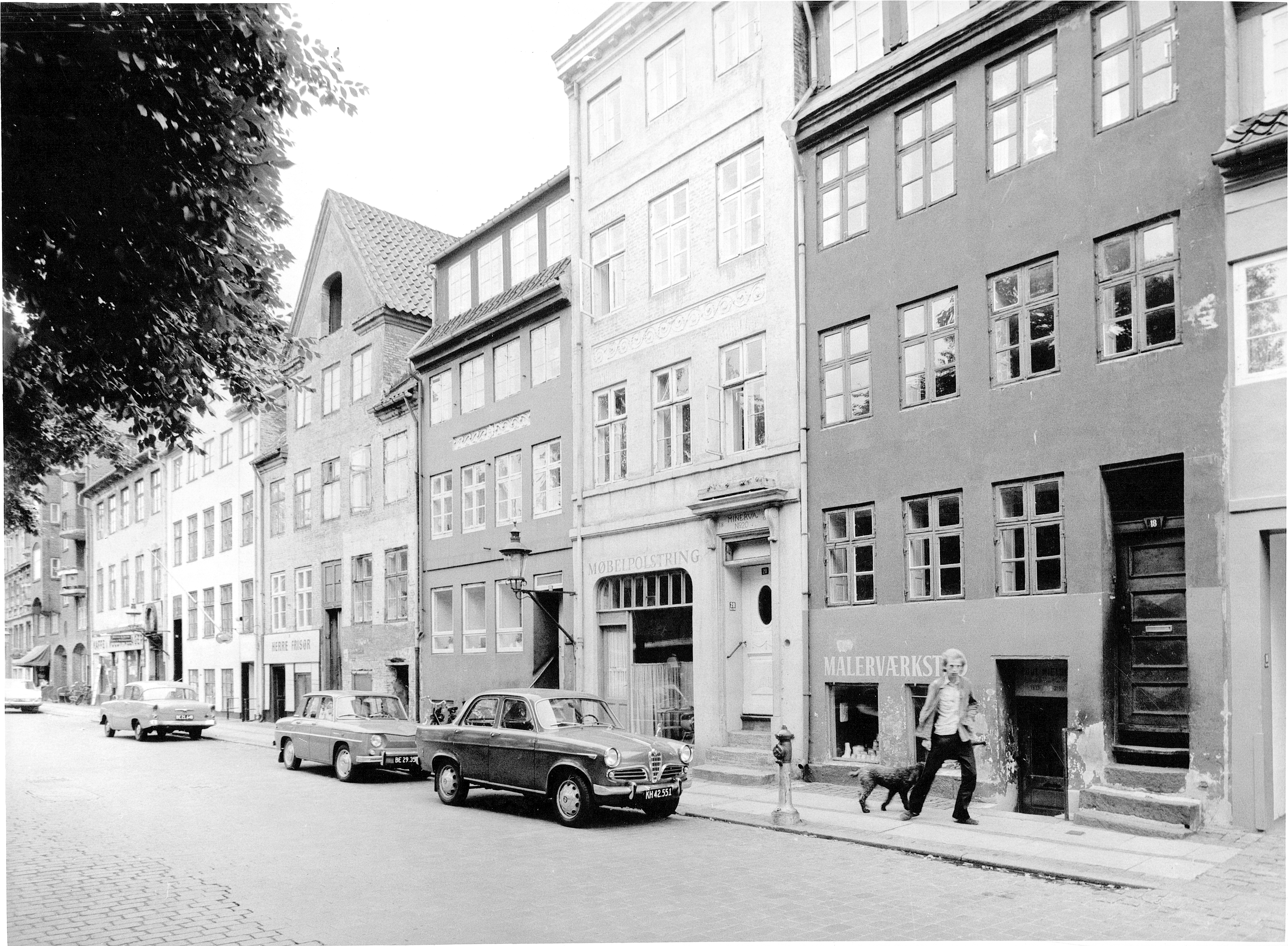
The building in 1965, one year before the ground floor was restored.

A shop with a large display window was installed on the ground floor in the 1800s. The building was listed in the Danish registry of protected buildings and places in 1918. The ground floor of the building was restored to its original design in connection with a renovation in 1966.

In 1927, No. 192 (Overgaden Oven Vandet 20) and No. 194 were both merged with No. 193 (as No. 193). In 1961, Overgaden Oven Vandet 20 was again disjoined from No. 193 as No. 546.

In 1985n–86, Henning Larsen Architects were responsible for undertaking another restoration of the building.

== Architecture ==
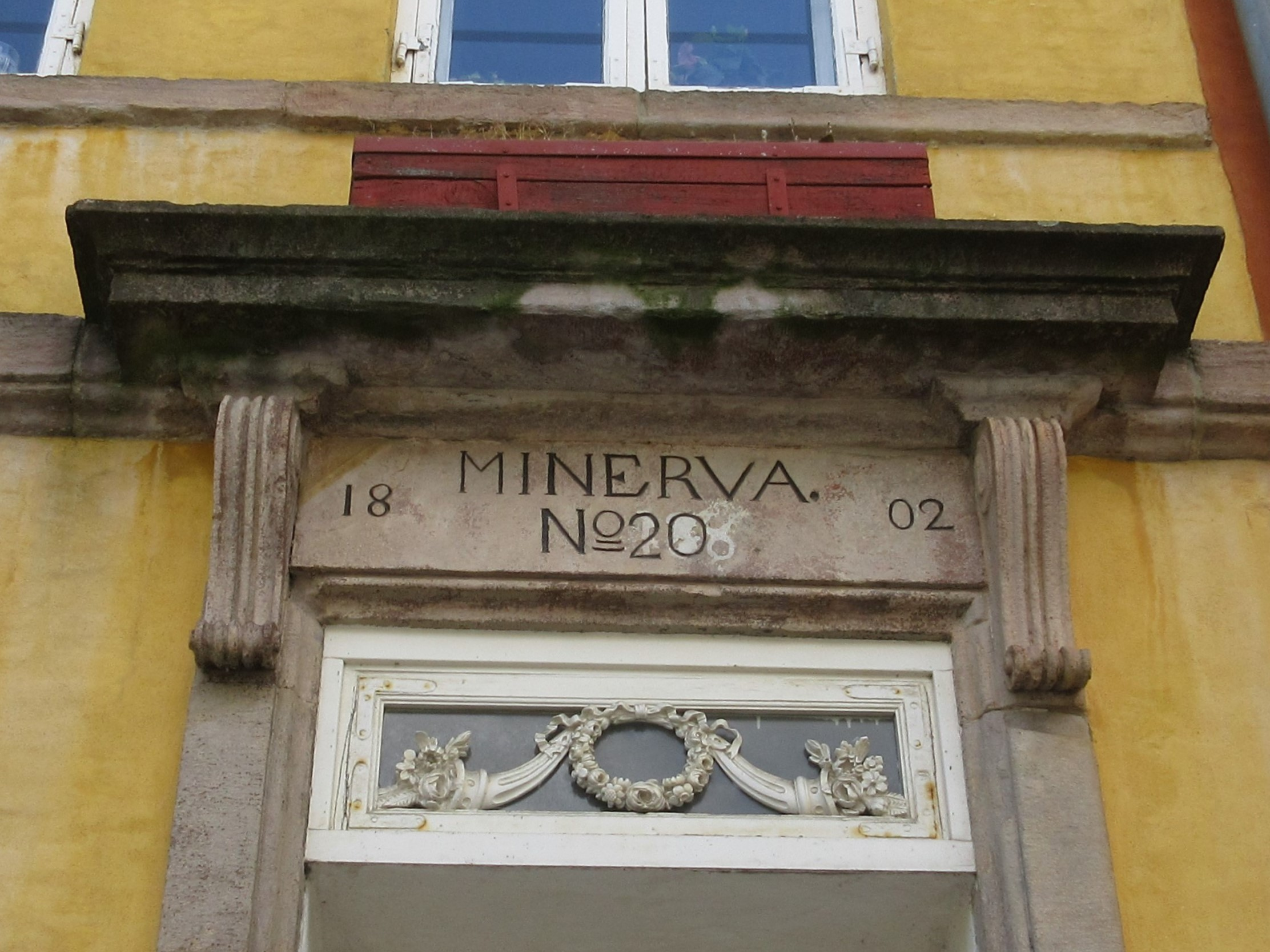
The Zinn family's music room

The building is constructed with four storeys over a walk-out basement and is just three bays wide. The pitched red tile roof is flanked by extended gables acting as firewalls. The plastered, yellow-painted facade is finished with a band of pink Nekxø sandstone above the ground floor, a sill course of the same material below the first floor windows. a frieze with botanical ornamentation between the windows of the first and second floors and a white-painted cornice supported by corbels. A slightly projecting, rectangular band between the windows of the two upper floors are painted in the same yellow colour as the rest of the facade. The main entrance in the bay furthest to the right (southwest) is raised a few steps from street level. It is topped by a hood mould supported by fluted corbels. The door is topped by a transom window with ornamentation representing a wreath fnanked by cornucopia with flowers. The space between the hood mould and the transom window features the inscription "Minerva" as well as the house number (No. 20) and the architectural date 1802.

A narrow, five-bays-long side wing extends from the reat side of the building. The integration of the two wings are improved by a canted bay in the corner, leaving the main wing with just one window towards the yard. The side wing is topped by a monopitched red tile roof. It features a four-bays-long "factory dormer", constructed to optimize the influx of natural light at a time when sources of artificial light were inefficient and constly. The building now shares a large courtyard with the a number of other buildings on both sides of the block.

== Today ==
The building was owned by Sten Nymark in 2008. It contains one apartment on each of the four floors.
