= Skodsborg =

- Town
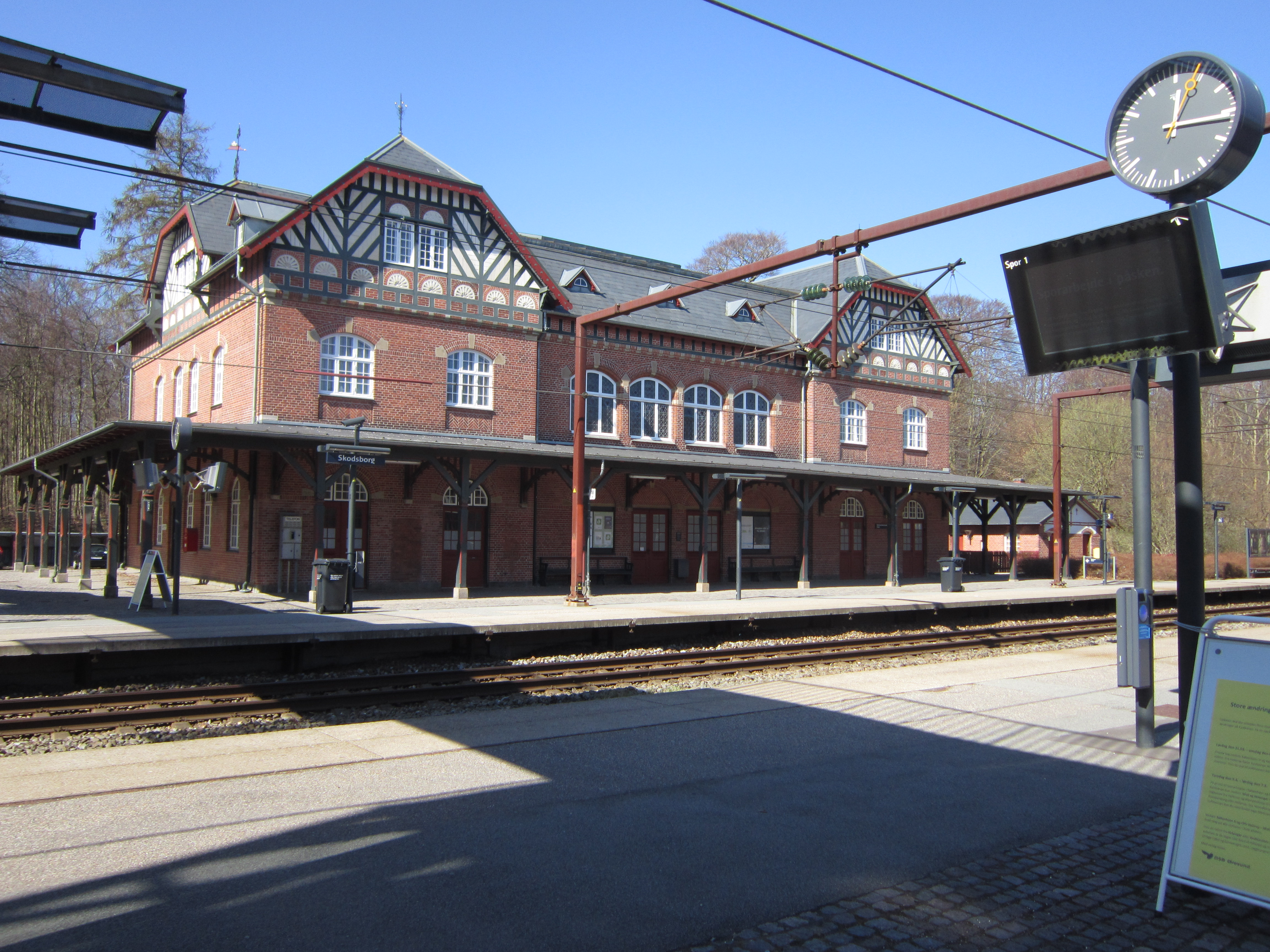
- Skodsborg station

- Location within Capital Region Location within Denmark
- Coordinates: 55°49′19″N 12°34′25″E
- Country: Denmark
- Region: Capital Region
- Municipality: Rudersdal Kommune

Area
  - Urban: 0.4 km^{2} (0.15 sq mi)

Population (2026)
  - Urban: 1,229
  - Urban density: 3,100/km^{2} (8,000/sq mi)
- Time zone: UTC+1 (CET)
  - Summer (DST): UTC+2 (CEST)
- Postal code: DK-2942 Skodsborg

Skodsborg is a small town/suburb approx. 20 km. north of Copenhagen, Denmark. The town has a population of 1,229 (1 January 2026) and lies in Rudersdal Kommune.

The town is a coastal town but doesn't have a marina. The town has good beach access from the Strandvej and from the houses along the shore. A wide beach allows easy access along the coast. The western side of Skodsborg borders the Jægersborg Dyrehave with miles of trails for hiking and cycling. The town is connected with the Oresundtrain and with buses to neighboring communities.

== History ==
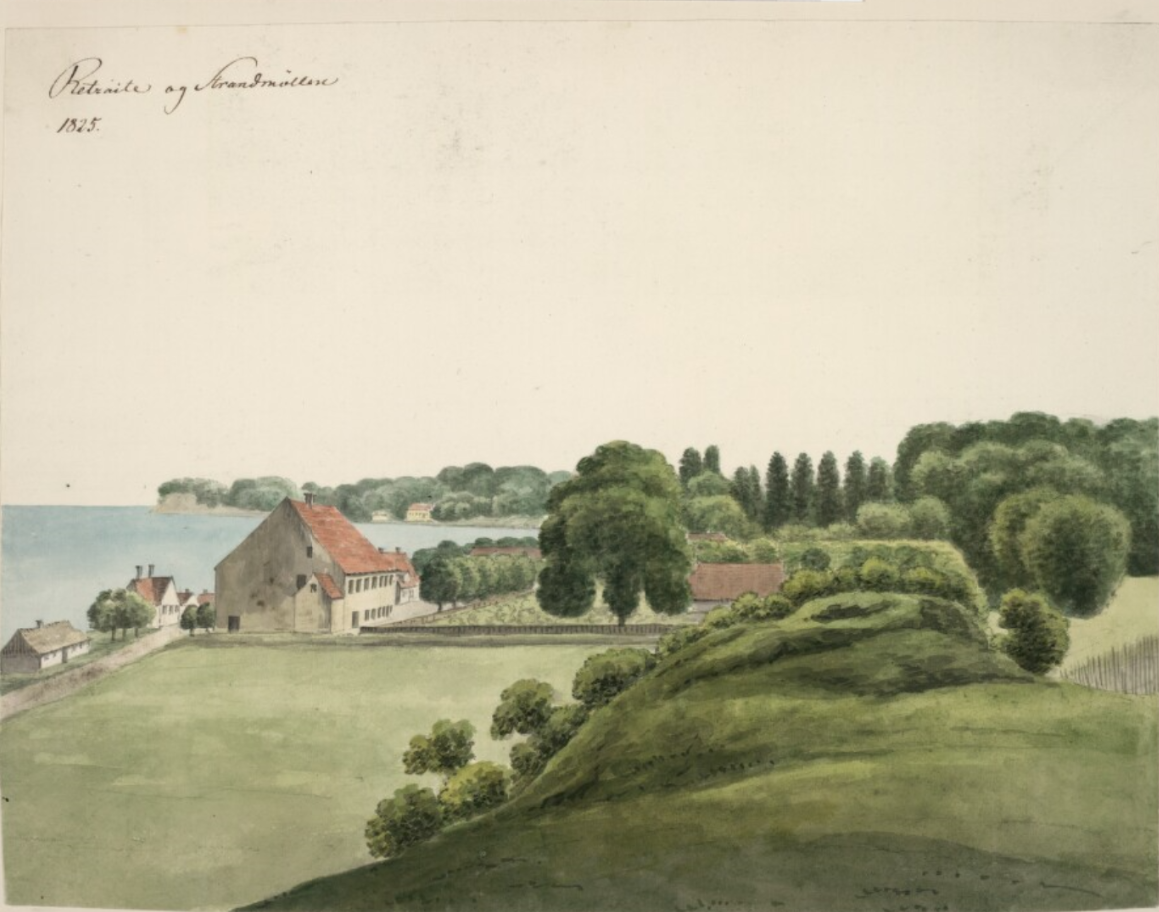
Ole Jørgen Rawert: Retraite and Strandmøllen, 1825

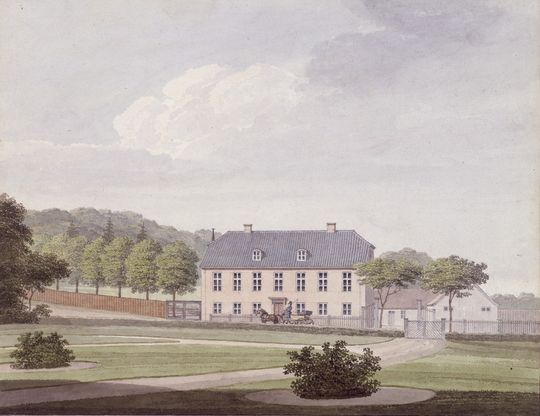
House in Skodsborg, watercolour by H. G. F. Holm, c. 1840

Skodsborg was a late developed community on the Øresund coast being hemmed in by the king's hunting forest of Dyrehaven. For many years, it was just a stretch of coastal road with a few summer residences of rich Copenhagen dignitaries and the Mølleå industry.

The river to the south of Skodsborg, Mølleåen, was the site of the earliest Danish industrial production. The first Danish paper mill was located there in 1599, as one of seven water mill-driven factories on the river. In 1785, two enterprising English industrialists, Nelthropp and Harris, established the country's largest leather goods manufacturing plant. They were bankrupted in 1803 during the Napoleonic wars, where England was the enemy, and they were condemned as spies.

Skodsborg continued its dual evolution as a summer residence for the very rich, with two hotels and a spa catering to the same clientele - along with its role as an active industrial town producing paper, cloth, and hats.

The most prominent dweller in Skodsborg was undoubtedly King Frederick VII. In 1852, he bought the Skodsborg summer residence built by Volrad von der Lühe a century earlier and spent the summers there until his death in 1863. He wanted a place away from the court gossip at Amalienborg aimed at his down to earth commoner wife, Louise Rasmussen, enabled with the title of Countess Danner. The king, who three years earlier had signed the Danish constitution cementing parliamentary rule, wanted peace and quiet to ride, hunt, and fish. He was an amateur archaeologist and outdoorsman who enjoyed excavating the Bronze Age burial mounds in the surrounding woodland and sleeping in his tent. However, his presence also required the building of the grand railway station still in use today, in order to meet and greet foreign dignitaries.

In 1910, the Danish social democrat leader, and later Prime Minister, Thorvald Stauning invited the Second Social International meeting in Copenhagen to visit Skodsborg. The visitors included Vladimir Lenin, Karl Liebknecht, Rosa Luxemburg, and Alexandra Kollontai. In Skodsborg they met a thriving working community with its own school and cooperative.

In 1913, Skodsborg saw the creation of Dansk Hattefabrik A/S (Danish Hat Factory Ltd), established by the visionary industrialist Hans Cohen, who came from Berlin. At its zenith in 1950, the plant was producing 500,000 hats per year.

== Landmarks ==
Rolighed, meaning "tranquility", was originally a large wooden house built in 1794 for the Norwegian civil servant Carsten Anker. In 1855, the house was acquired by Ludvig Grøn, owner of Det Grønske Handelshus, Copenhagen's first department store. The house remained in the hands of his family until 1958. The current ahouse is from 1827. It is now owned by A.P. Møller-Mærsk and used as a conference centre.

== Notable people ==
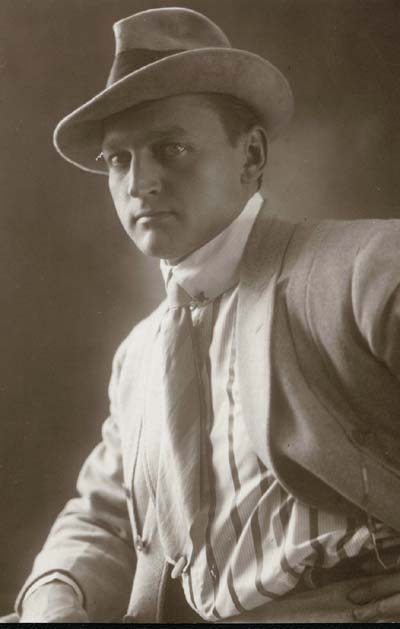
Johannes Meyer, 1926

- Johan Christian Drewsen (1777 at Strandmøllen - 1851) a Danish paper manufacturer, agronomist and politician, he owned Strandmøllen near Skodsborg
- Oda Nielsen (1851 in Liepāja – 1936 in Skodsborg) an acclaimed Danish actress
- Christopher Tostrup Paus, Count of Paus (1862 in Christiania – 1943 in Skodsborg) a Norwegian landowner, papal chamberlain, count, philanthropist, art collector and socialite
- Esther Carstensen (1873 in Skodsborg – 1955) a Danish women's rights activist and journal editor
- Johannes Meyer (1884 in Skodsborg – 1972) a Danish film actor
- Ragnhild Fabricius Gjellerup (1896 – 1958 in Skodsborg) a lawyer, the first woman judge in Denmark
- Raquel Rastenni (1915 – 1998 in Skodsborg) a popular Danish singer
- Flemming Østergaard (born 1943 in Ordrup), businessman, owns F.C. Copenhagen, lives in Skodsborg

== Gallery ==
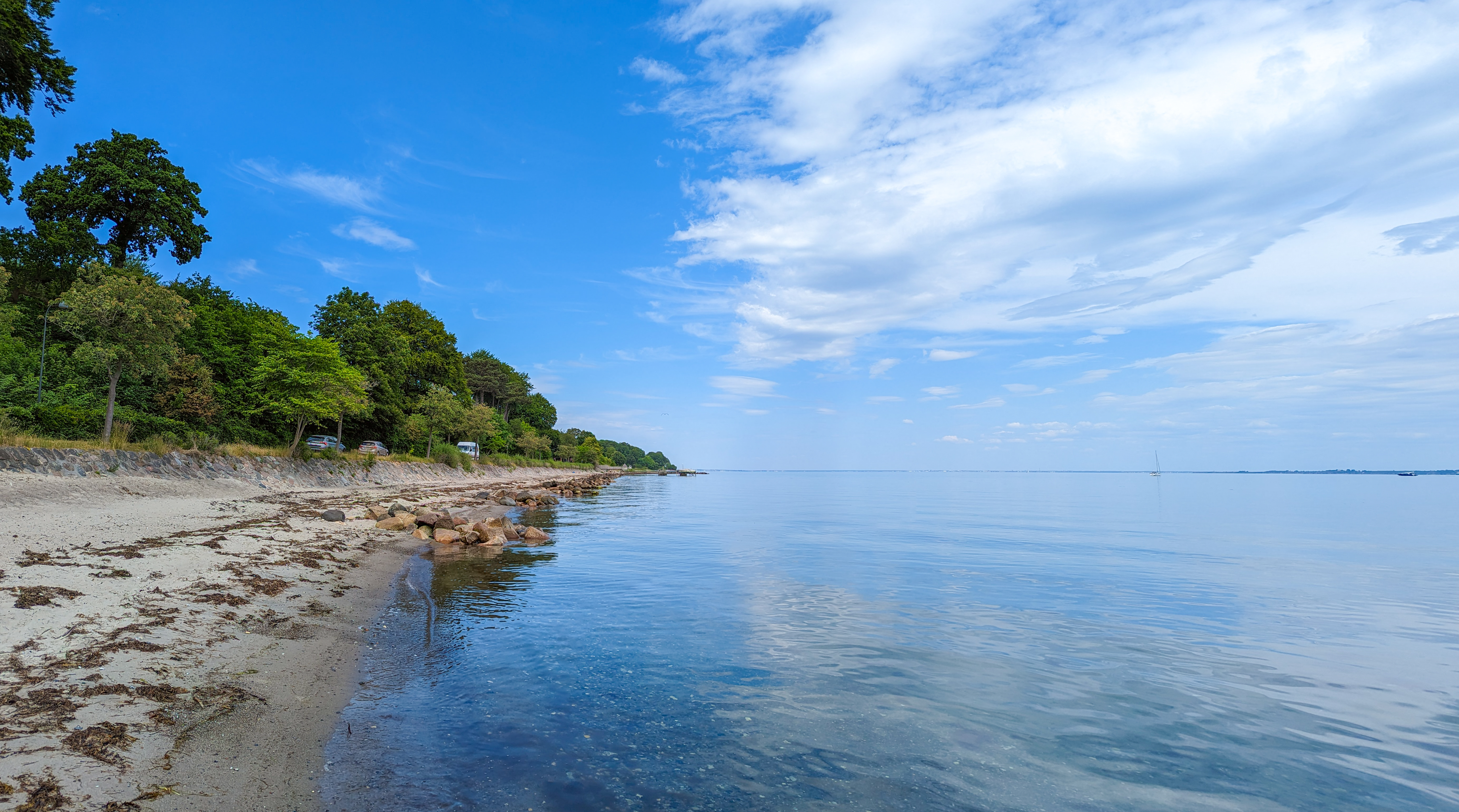
Skodsborg Beach

== See also ==
- Skodsborg Spa Hotel
