= Spider vision =

Eyes of spiders

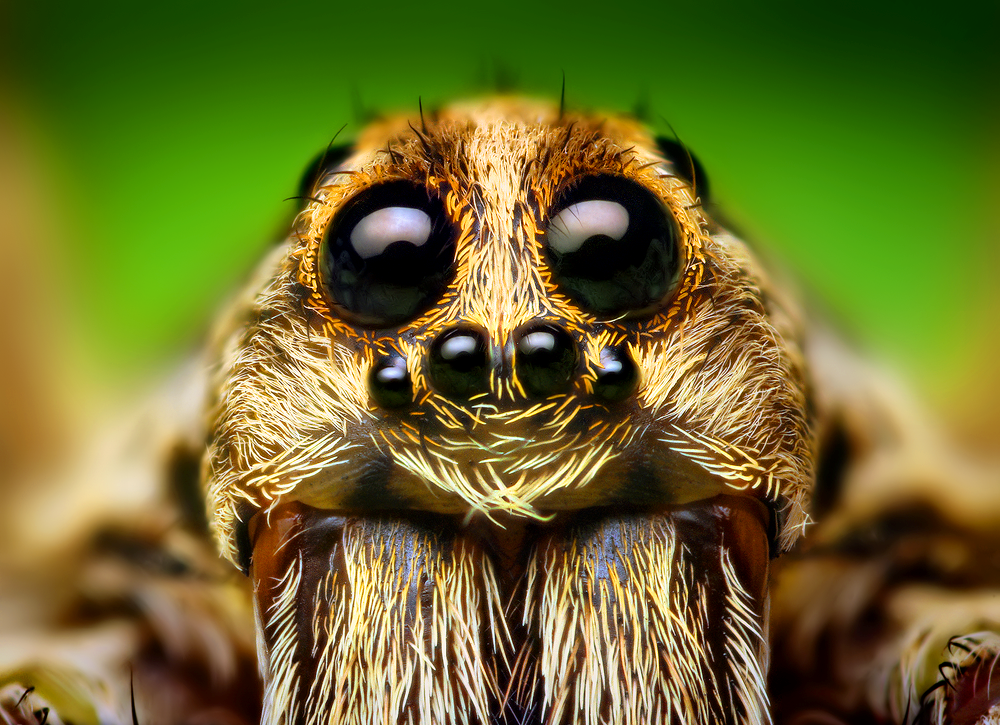
Hogna wolf spider (family Lycosidae) showing the enlarged posterior median eyes typical of the family

The eyes of spiders vary significantly in their structure, arrangement, and function. They usually have eight, each being a simple eye with a single lens rather than multiple units as in the compound eyes of insects. The specific arrangement and structure of the eyes is one of the features used in the identification and classification of different species, genera, and families. Most haplogynes have six eyes, although some have eight (Plectreuridae), four (e.g., Tetrablemma) or even two (most Caponiidae). In some cave species, there are no eyes at all (e.g. Stalita taenaria). Sometimes one pair of eyes is better developed than the rest. Several families of hunting spiders, such as jumping spiders and wolf spiders, have fair to excellent vision. The main pair of eyes in jumping spiders even sees in colour.

== Structure and anatomy ==
Spiders' eyes are simple eyes, or ocelli (singular ocellus), meaning their eyes have a single cuticular lens above a simple retina. The retina is concave and composed of visual and pigment cells, which lie beneath a cellular vitreous body.

=== Categorisation ===
Basic arrangement of spider eyes, viewed from above

Most spiders have eight eyes, which tend to be arranged into two rows of four eyes on the head region. The eyes can be categorised by their location and are divided into the anterior median eyes (AME), anterior lateral eyes (ALE), posterior median eyes (PME), and posterior lateral eyes (PLE). The exact arrangement of the eyes varies significantly by family, and to a lesser degree genus, so is often used as a diagnostic feature to identify or categorise spiders, especially in the field. They can also be categorised by structure into the principal eyes (or main eyes), which are always the AME, and the secondary eyes, which are always the PME, ALE, and PLE. In six-eyed species, it is always the principal eyes which are absent. The secondary eyes normally have a light-reflecting layer, the tapetum, that makes the eyes appear pale. The tapetum differs considerably between spider families but can be separated into three main types: PT (primitive type), CT (canoe type), and GT (grate type). Some spiders, such as jumping spiders, have no tapetum in their secondary eyes.

Cross-sections of types of eye
Principal eye	The three main types of secondary eyes		
Principal eye	Primitive type	Canoe type	Grate type
Key: 1 – lens; 2 – vitreous layer; 3 – visual cells; 4 – rhabdomeres (light-sensitive component of the visual cells); 5 – tapetum; 6 – retina; 7 – optic nerve

=== Principal eyes ===
In most species, the principal eyes are more visually acute than the secondary eyes, at the cost of their sensitivity. They lack a tapetum entirely, and the retina is everted, meaning the rhabdomeres (light-sensitive parts of the visual cells) point towards the incoming light. Some species can move the retina using between one and six muscles, greatly increasing the field of view. No actual focusing takes place; it is unnecessary, since the small lenses and short focal length of most spiders' principal eyes lead to a wide depth of field. When a spider has colour vision, it is typically the principal eyes which are responsible.

=== Secondary eyes ===
The secondary eyes have an inverted retina, meaning the rhabdomeres face away from the incoming light. They also typically have a tapetum made up of crystals, which are likely guanine. Because incoming light passes through the rhabdomeres both before and after being reflected by the tapetum, the sensitivity of the eyes is essentially doubled. The exact structure of the tapetum varies significantly between families and genera, so is sometimes used as a diagnostic feature. Despite this variation, it can be divided into three main groups:

1. The primitive-type tapetum fills the entire eye cup with holes only for the nerves; it is found mainly in the haplogyne, Mesothelae, and Mygalomorph (the more 'primitive') spiders.
2. The canoe-type tapetum is formed by two walls divided by a median gap, where the nerves exit; it is found in many families, including Theridiidae, Clubionidae, and Amaurobiidae.
3. The grate-type tapetum is the most efficient; the long vitreous body and spherical lens combine to produce a sharp, in focus image. It forms rows of crystals which lie beneath the visual cells, and the nerves exit through the gaps in the 'grate'. This type is found primarily in hunting spiders such as wolf spiders and fishing spiders.

== Function ==
The visual fields of a jumping spider

Most spiders' eyes can detect little more than brightness and motion, so vision plays only a minor role in behaviour. However some groups, such as jumping spiders, wolf spiders, and deinopids, have more developed eyes which they use in hunting and courtship. In species which can perceive colour, it is typically the principal eyes with colour perception.

=== Detection of polarised light ===
All spiders possess photosensitive microvilli which have the capacity to be sensitive to the polarisation of light, as they preferentially absorb light oscillating parallel to their long axis. These microvilli are arranged orthogonally in the eyes of several families, including jumping spiders, wolf spiders, and nursery web spiders. This is significant, because this orthogonal arrangement is also present in the 'dorsal rim area' used by some insects to detect the polarisation of light. Additionally, many spider families' secondary eyes possess polarising tapeta which may enhance the perception of polarised light. Despite this fact only one species, Drassodes cupreus, has been observed to detect polarised light with their secondary eyes. Agelenids and lycosids have been shown to detect polarised light with the principal eyes. The tarantula species Aphonopelma hentzi has also been shown to make use of polarised light in navigation.

== Evolution ==
The evolution of spiders' eyes has received little attention, and as such not much is known on the subject. The principal and secondary eyes likely evolved separately, with the principal eyes being homologous to the ocelli of insects but the secondary eyes being derived from compound eyes. Since the secondary eyes lack the remnants of the borders between the ommatidia typically present in eyes evolved through fusion of the ommatidia, it is more likely that they developed through separation.

== See also ==
- Arthropod eye
- Spider anatomy
- Simple eye in invertebrates
