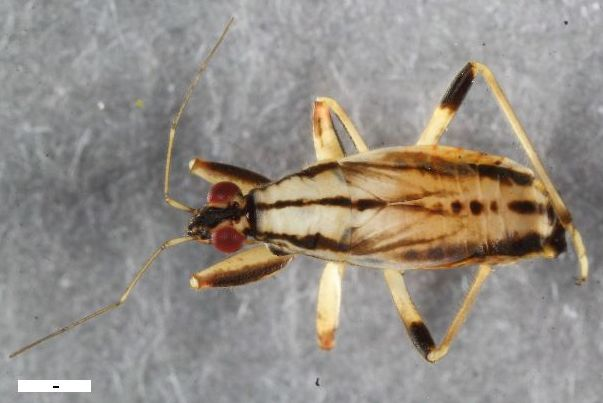

Scientific classification
- Kingdom: Animalia
- Phylum: Arthropoda
- Class: Insecta
- Order: Hemiptera
- Suborder: Heteroptera
- Family: Nabidae
- Genus: Himacerus
- Species: H. boops

Binomial name
- Himacerus boops Schiødte, 1870

= Himacerus boops =

Species of true bug

Himacerus boops is a species of damsel bug in the family Nabidae. It is found from South Scandinavia and the South of the British Isles over Western and Central Europe and East across the Palearctic to Siberia and in the Caspian region. They are not present in most parts of the Mediterranean.

Many different habitats without vegetation are inhabited by this species. They occur in wet meadows and even in dry, warm, sandy habitats with barren vegetation, on moorland or on grassland and also in habitats influenced by salt near the coast or inland.

Both the nymphs and the imagines of Himacerus boops live on the ground and rarely climb on grass. They are mainly nocturnal. Overwintering occurs as the egg. They are inserted by the females in blades of grass. The nymphs occur from May until the end of July, the adult from early July ( under favourable conditions from mid-June). Pairing can be seen until well into the autumn and individual have been found in November.
