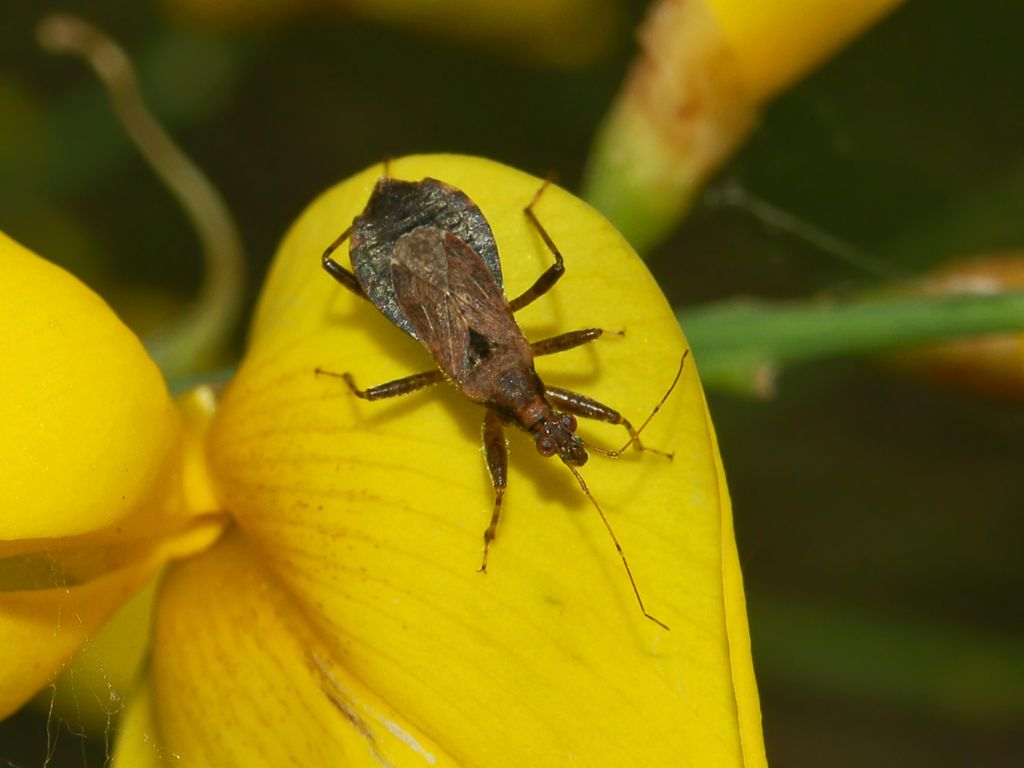
- Himacerus mirmicoides, upperside
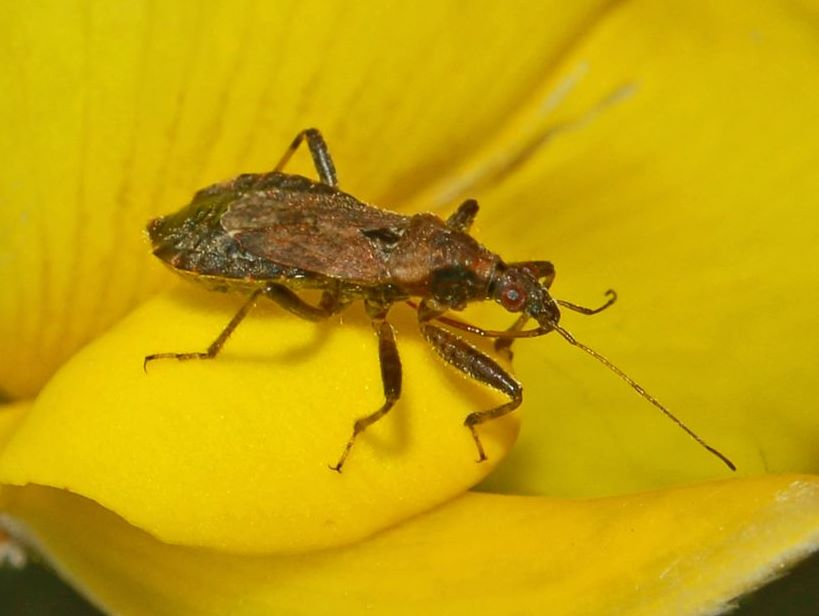
- Side view

Scientific classification
- Kingdom: Animalia
- Phylum: Arthropoda
- Clade: Pancrustacea
- Class: Insecta
- Order: Hemiptera
- Suborder: Heteroptera
- Family: Nabidae
- Genus: Himacerus
- Species: H. mirmicoides

Binomial name
- Himacerus mirmicoides (O. G. Costa, 1834)

Synonyms
- Aptus mirmicoides (O. G. Costa, 1834)

= Himacerus mirmicoides =

Species of true bug

Himacerus mirmicoides, common name ant damsel bug, is a species of damsel bugs belonging to the family Nabidae, subfamily Nabinae.

== Etymology ==
The name “mirmicoides” comes from the similarity of nymphs in the early instars to ants.

== Distribution ==
These bugs can be found in most of Europe.

== Habitat ==
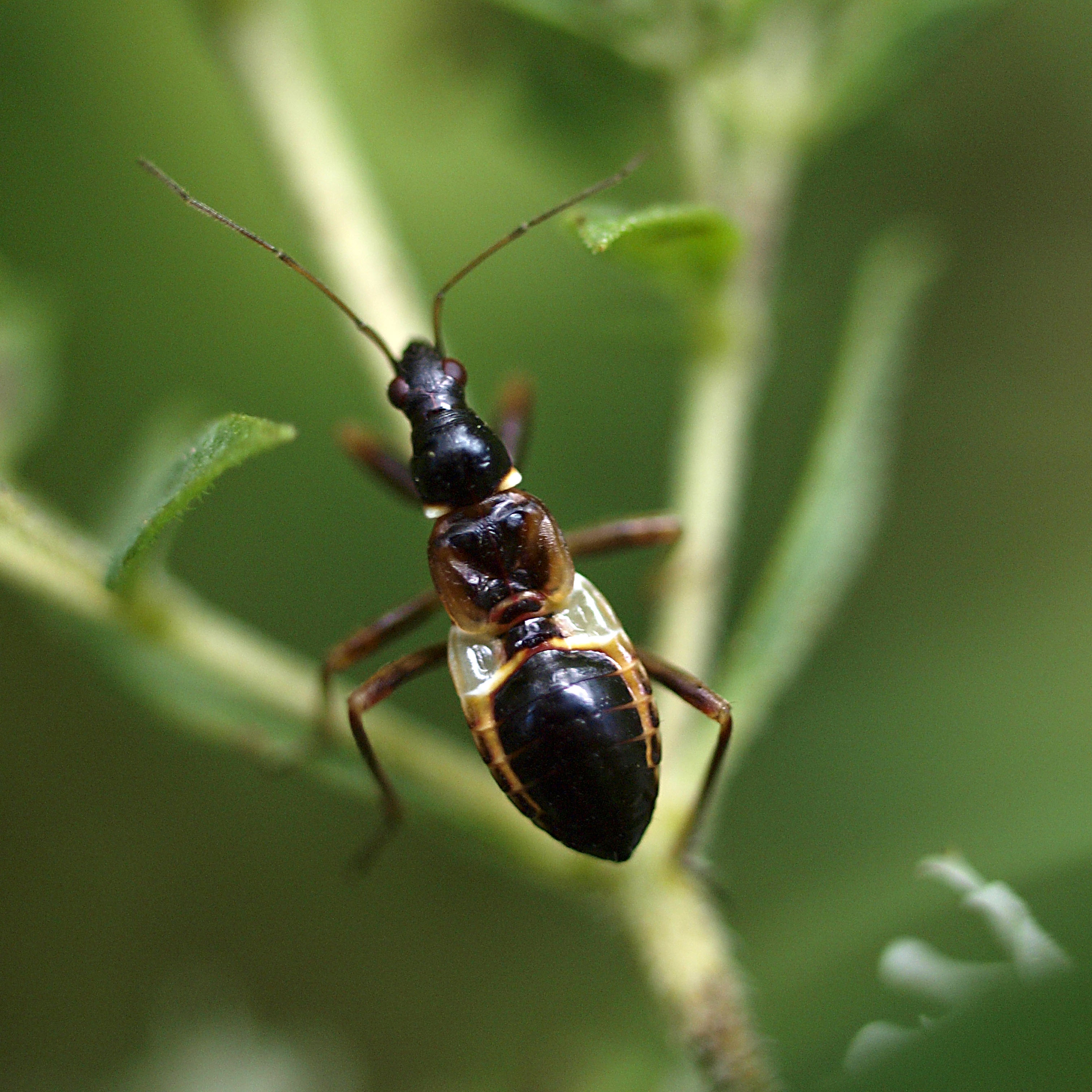
Nymph

These bugs can be found on the ground, in low herbage and in dry open areas.

== Description ==
Himacerus mirmicoides can reach a length of 7–8 millimetres (0.28–0.31 in). These bugs have a brown body with a black connexivum showing orange-red spots. They are partly-winged, with quite reddish wings.

This species is rather similar to Himacerus apterus, but it is smaller, with shorter antennae and longer wings. Moreover, the hairs on the hind tibiae are shorter.

The nymphs resemble ants and the appearance of a typical hymenopteran "waist" is created by the paler coloration of the back of the thorax, contrasting with the rest of the body which is mainly black.

== Biology ==
Adults can be found all year around. Mating and egg-laying begins in spring with the new generation occurring in August.
