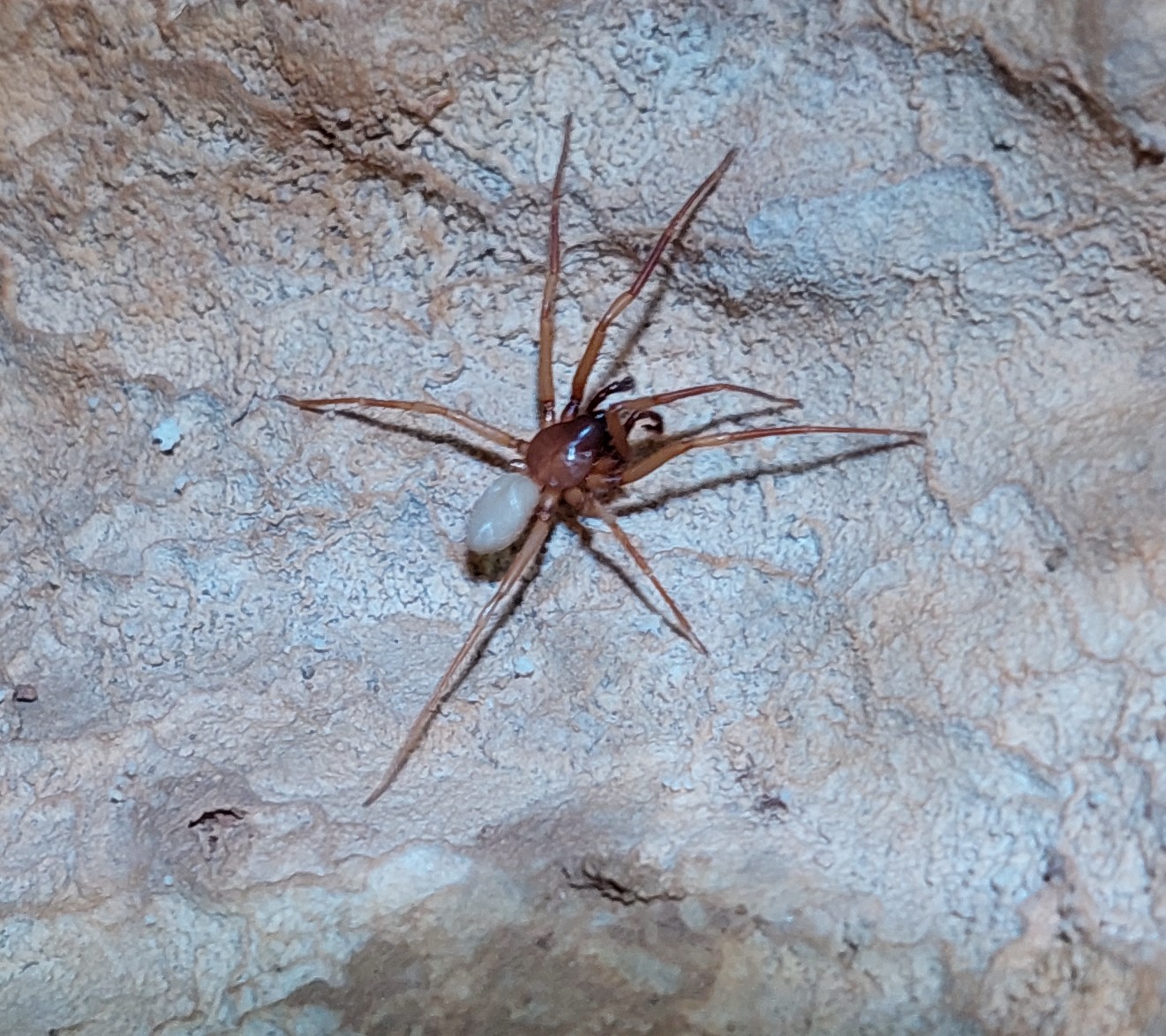
- Stalita taenaria, cave in Slovenian Karst

Scientific classification
- Kingdom: Animalia
- Phylum: Arthropoda
- Subphylum: Chelicerata
- Class: Arachnida
- Order: Araneae
- Infraorder: Araneomorphae
- Family: Dysderidae
- Genus: Stalita; Schiödte, 1847

Type species
- S. taenaria Schiødte, 1847

Species
- 4, see text

= Stalita =

Genus of spiders

Stalita is a genus of European woodlouse hunting spiders that was first described by J. C. Schiødte in 1847.

== Species ==
As of 2023 it contains five species:

- Stalita hadzii Kratochvíl, 1934 – Slovenia
- Stalita inermifemur Roewer, 1931 – Slovenia, Croatia
- Stalita pretneri Deeleman-Reinhold, 1971 – Croatia
- Stalita schioedtei Thorell, 1870
- Stalita taenaria Schiødte, 1847 (type) – Italy, Slovenia, Croatia
