= Strandmøllen =

Strandmøllen (Danish may refer to:

Buildings

- Strandmøllen, Rudersdal Municipality, a former paper mill north of Copenhagen
- Strandmøllen, Roskilde Municipalitym a watermill in Roskilde

Other

- A/S Strandmøllen, a company based in Strandmøllen
