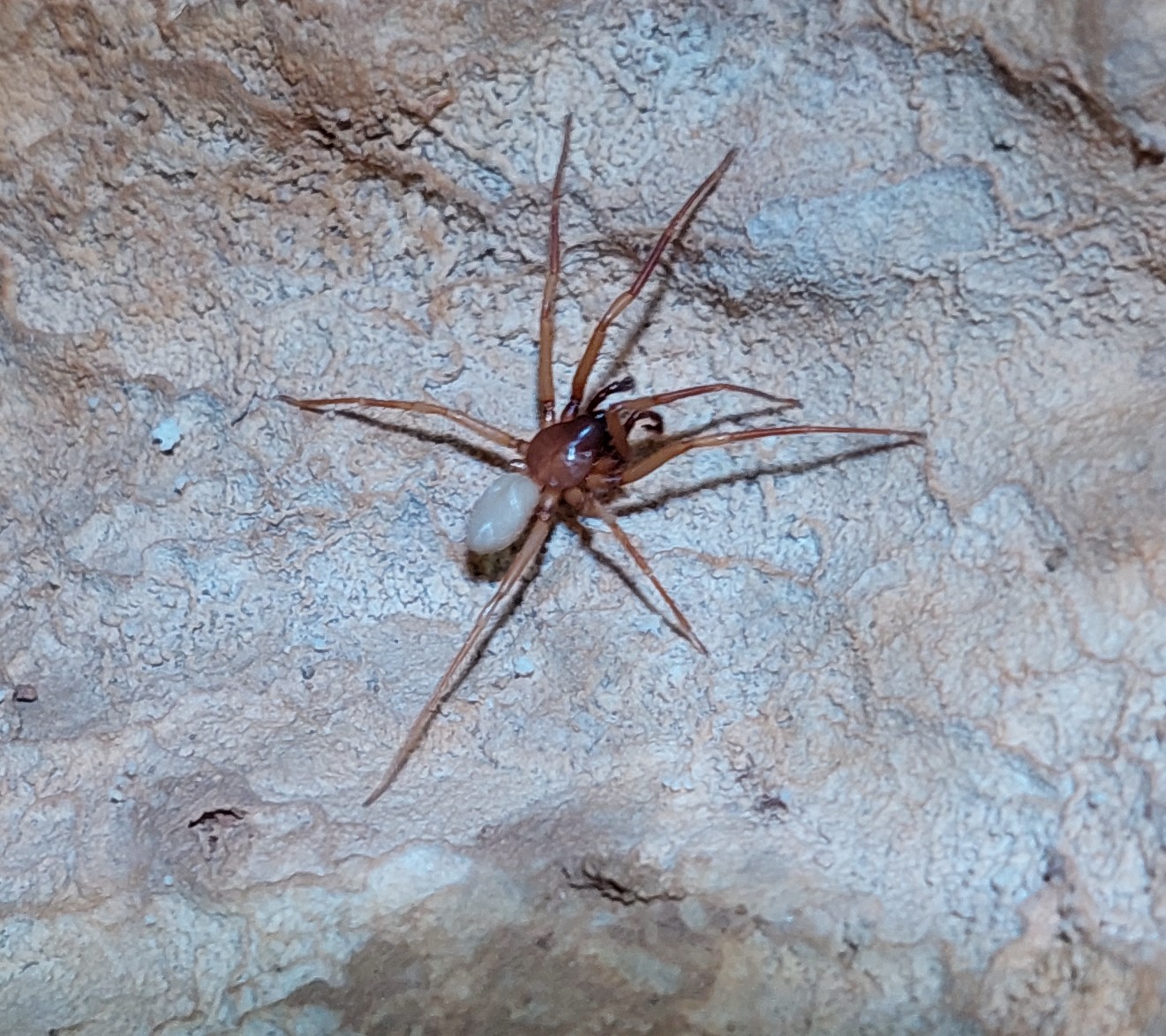
- Stalita taenaria, cave in Slovenian Karst

Scientific classification
- Kingdom: Animalia
- Phylum: Arthropoda
- Subphylum: Chelicerata
- Class: Arachnida
- Order: Araneae
- Infraorder: Araneomorphae
- Family: Dysderidae
- Genus: Stalita
- Species: S. taenaria

Binomial name
- Stalita taenaria Schiodte, 1847

Synonyms
- Stalita spinosissima Kulczyński

= Stalita taenaria =

Species of cave spider

Stalita taenaria is an araneomorph spider species in the family Dysderidae. The species is classified as a member of troglofauna, more precisely a troglobiont species, meaning such spiders are obligate cave-dwellers adapted to living in dark surroundings. Stalita taenaria is a species of a few European countries. The spider is thought to be the first described species of true (eyeless) cave spider in the world.

== Taxonomy ==
The species was first described and named by Danish entomologist Jørgen Matthias Christian Schiødte in 1847. In the same year Schiødte also named and described the genus Stalita, while making Stalita taenaria its type species. Besides S. taenaria there are three more species in the same genus.

== Description ==
=== Males ===
Males of this species are approximately 6.7 millimetres long. They have densely haired and oval opisthosoma (abdomen) which is of bright ivory colour. Their legs are reddish-brown and covered with many characteristic spines which are located only on a spider's tibial and femoral part of a leg. A spider has a flattened prosoma (cephalothorax) of dark rusty-brown colour. Bulbs of their pedipalps are quite long and shaped nearly cylindrical; they end with many long teeth. A peak of the embolus is claw-shaped.

=== Females ===
Females of this species are a bit bigger, usually reaching from 7 to 9 millimetres of length, with their prosoma reaching from 3.2 to 3.7 millimetres. A female's mouth parts, the chelicerae, consist of a promargin with three and retromargin containing only one tooth. A characteristic of females is also a vulva, which has T-shaped anterior part.

== Distribution ==
Stalita taenaria is a relatively rare European troglobite species, limited to countries of Slovenia, Italy and Croatia.

== Gallery ==
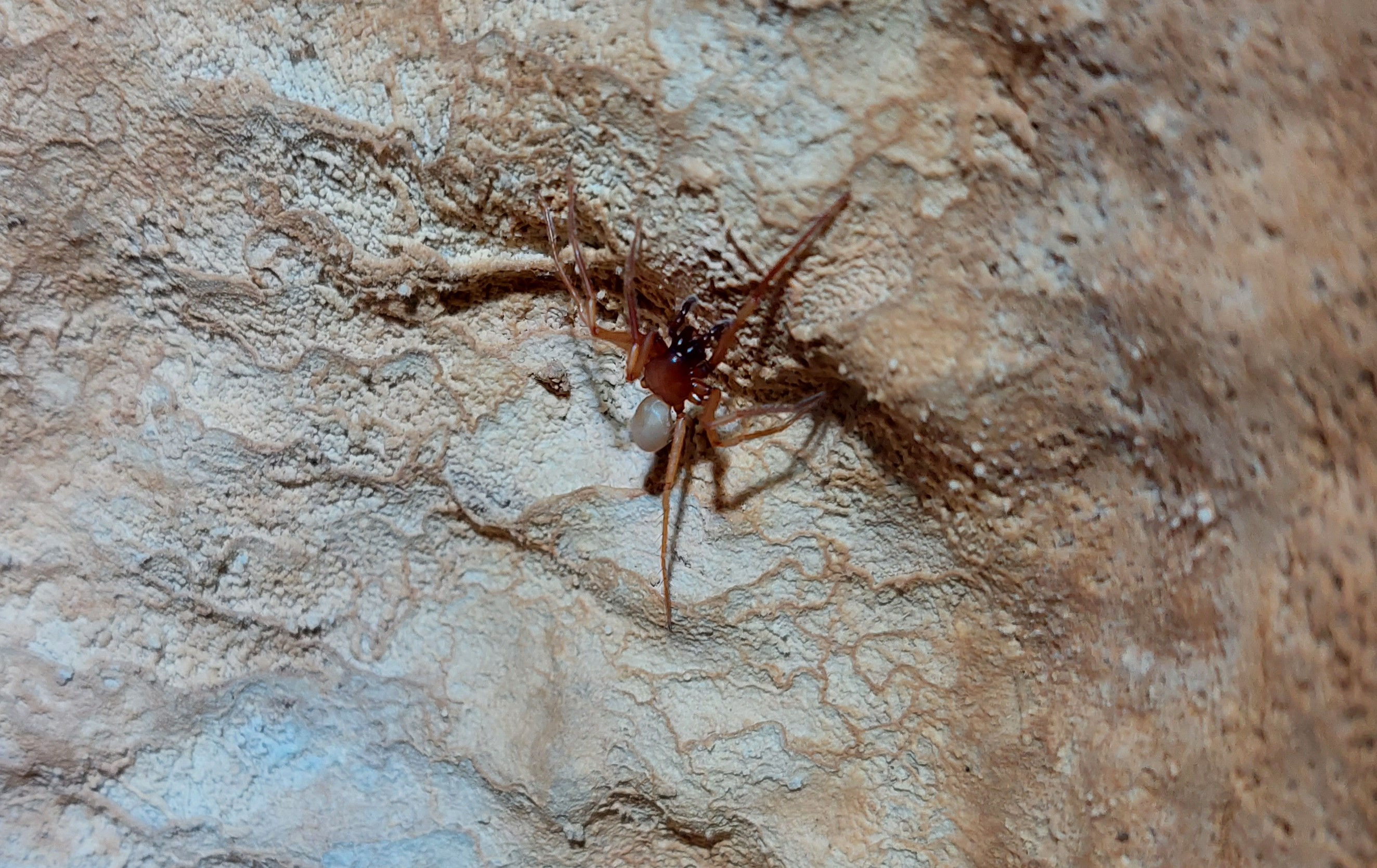

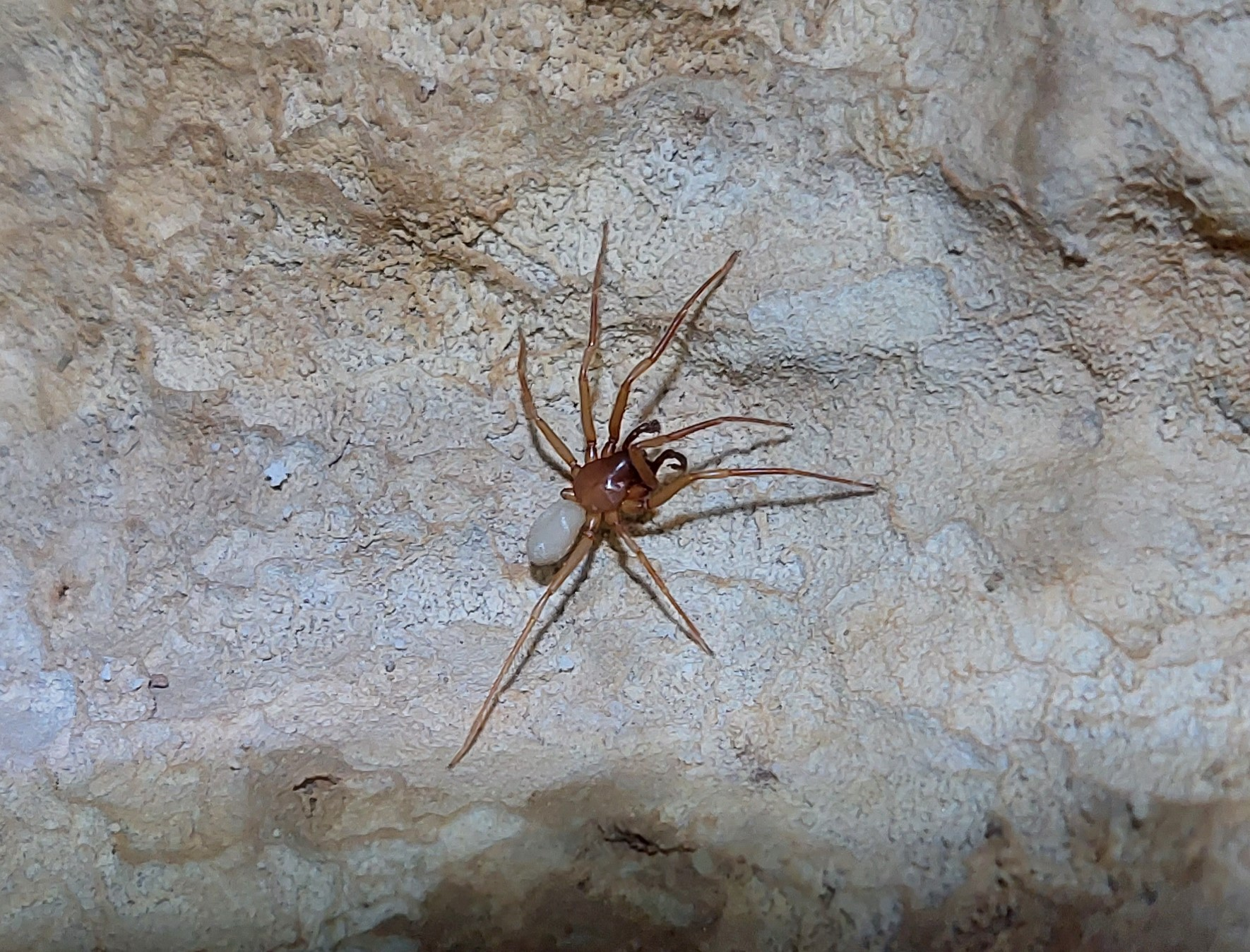
