= Ragnhild Fabricius Gjellerup =

Danish lawyer

Ragnhild Louise Kathrine Dorothea Lindegaard Smidt Fabricius Gjellerup (1896–1958) was a Danish lawyer who graduated in 1922 from the University of Copenhagen. In 1934, she became the first woman in Denmark to serve as a judge.

== Biography ==
Born on 25 March 1896 in Copenhagen, Ragnhild Louise Kathrine Dorothea Lindegaard Smidt Fabricius was the daughter of Lieutenant Carl Smidt Fabricius (1855–1942) and his wife Christiane Hansine Juliette Knudsen (1860–1924). In 1922, she married Holger Otto Gjellerup (1883–1959), a merchant.

Her marriage exerted considerable influence on her career as from 1923 she became secretary at the municipal court in Copenhagen where she remained for the rest of her professional life. In 1927, she was appointed secretary of the probate court (skifteretten) until she became a judge in 1934, the first woman in Denmark to do so. She specialized in probate, dealing with many complex inheritance cases as a competent mediator. From 1946 to 1950, she headed the arbitral tribunal on housing, also covering business protection.

Fabricius Gjellerup was one of the most active members of the Danish Women's Society, especially during the German occupation which began in 1940. She was particularly effective in arranging food distribution in the war years, managing the transfer of relief supplies from the countryside. In 1952, she was elected to the board of the Animals Protection Society. In 1951, she became one of the first women to be honoured with the Order of the Dannebrog.

After an extended period of weakness, Ragnhild Fabricius Gjellerup died in Skodsborg on 29 October 1958, 62 years old.
