= Oda Nielsen =

Danish actress

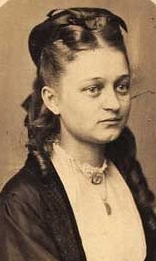
- Born: Oda Laurenze Helmine Larsen; 7 August 1851; Liepāja, Latvia
- Died: 11 September 1936 (aged 85); Skodsborg, Denmark
- Occupation: Actress
- Years active: 1870 — 1920
- Spouses: Jens Petersen, Martinius Nielsen
- Parent(s): Jens Larsen, Caresia Møller

Oda Laurenze Helmine Nielsen née Larsen (1851–1936) was a highly acclaimed Danish actress who performed both in private theatres in Copenhagen and at the Royal Danish Theatre. Inspired by French actresses, she played the roles of attractive young women, for example in the title roles of Frøken Nitouche and Victorien Sardou's Dora. She later took on roles where she sang, imitating the French singer Yvette Guilbert. This increased her popularity not only in Scandinavia but also in the United States where she performed for Danish audiences. One of her favourite roles in later life was Grevinde Danner (Countess Danner) in Sven Leopold's Hos Grevinden.

== Biography ==
Born on 7 August 1851 in Liepāja, Latvia, Oda Laurenze Helmine Larsen was the daughter of the ship owner Jens Larsen (1820–85) and Caresia Møller (1822–74). In 1871, she married the telegraphy executive Jens Petersen (1843–80) and in 1884, the actor Martinius Nielsen (1859-1928).

Nielsen's début was in May 1870 at the Casino Theatre, Copenhagen, when she acted anonymously in Erik Bogh's Vaudeville play Et enfoldigt Pigebarn. Despite her lack of any previous stage experience, she proved a great success, thanks to her natural grace and her good singing voice. After a few more roles at the Casino, in 1871 she married an executive from the Store Nordiske Telegrafselskab whom she accompanied to Paris where he was stationed until his death in 1880. Now familiar with the theatrical repertoire in Paris, she returned to the Casino in 1881, playing the title role in Victorien Sardou's Dora, arousing comparisons with the French actress Sarah Bernhardt.

Such was her success that she was also invited to act at the Royal Danish Theatre but she actually preferred appearing at the Casino and later at the Dagmar Theatre. Here, in 1884, she was enormously successful in the operetta Frøken Nitouche, appearing 500 times. That year she married the actor Martin Nielsen, joining him in performances of plays by Adam Oehlenschläger, Ludvig Holberg and Henrik Ibsen at the Royal Theatre over the next six years. Her husband then took over the management of the Casino Theatre and merged it with the Dagmar, benefiting from the support of his wife. Her popularity continued to increase, especially when she imitated the French singer Yvette Guilbert in works such as Sardou's Madame Sans-Gêne. In 1906, she went to the United States on a singing tour, performing for Danish audiences.

In later life, one of her most successful roles was Grevinde Danner in Svend Leopold's Hos Grevinden which she continued to perform in the provinces until she was almost 80. In 1910, she was awarded the Ingenio et arti and in 1920 the Danish Medal of Merit.

Oda Nielsen died in Skodsborg on 11 September 1936 and is buried in Copenhagen's Vestre Cemetery.
