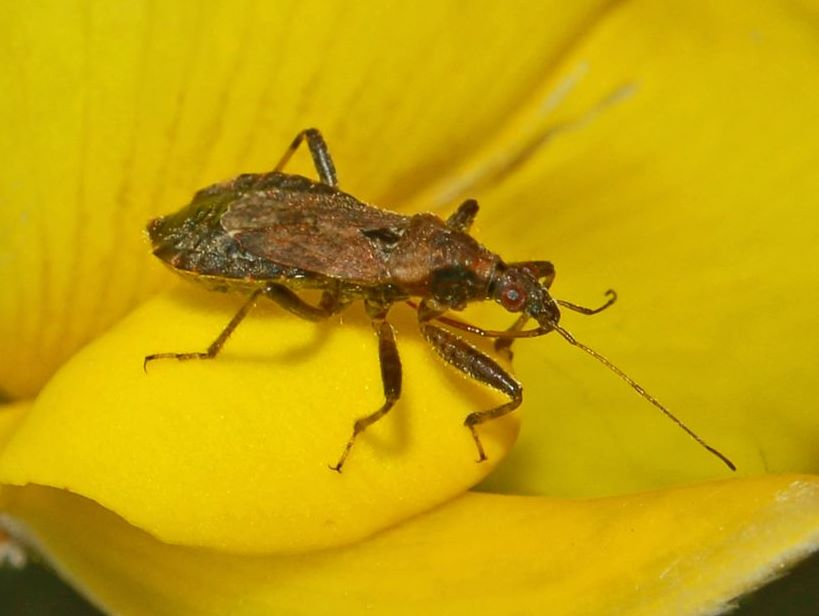
- Himacerus mirmicoides

Scientific classification
- Domain: Eukaryota
- Kingdom: Animalia
- Phylum: Arthropoda
- Class: Insecta
- Order: Hemiptera
- Suborder: Heteroptera
- Family: Nabidae
- Subfamily: Nabinae
- Genus: Himacerus; Wolff, 1811

= Himacerus =

Genus of true bugs

Himacerus is a genus of damsel bugs belonging to the family Nabidae, subfamily Nabinae.

== Species ==
- Himacerus apterus (Fabricius, 1798) - tree damsel bug
- Himacerus boops (Schiødte, 1870)
- Himacerus dauricus (Kiritshenko, 1911)
- Himacerus major (A. Costa, 1842) - grey damsel bug
- Himacerus mirmicoides (O. Costa, 1834) - ant damsel bug
