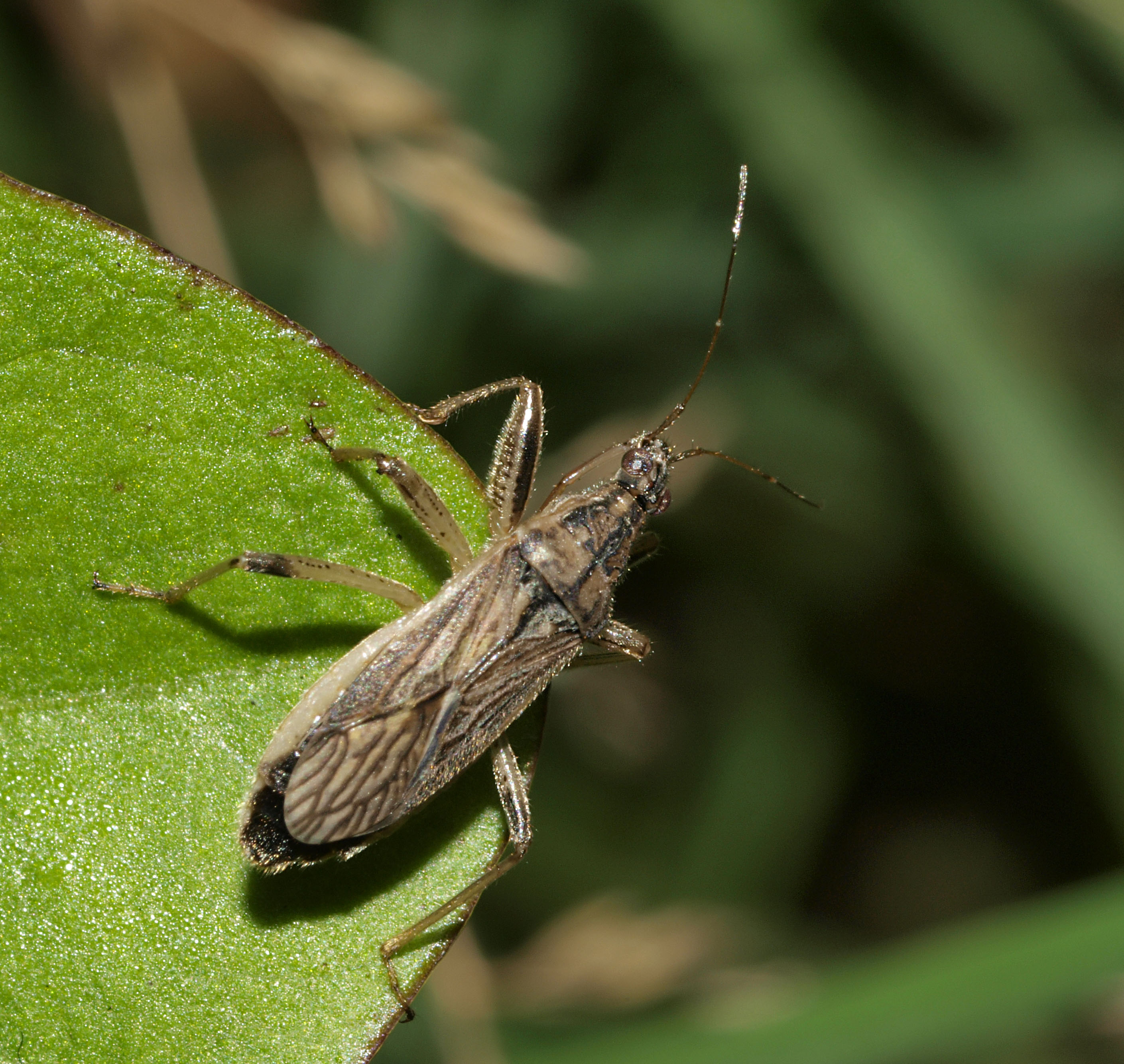

Scientific classification
- Domain: Eukaryota
- Kingdom: Animalia
- Phylum: Arthropoda
- Class: Insecta
- Order: Hemiptera
- Suborder: Heteroptera
- Family: Nabidae
- Genus: Himacerus
- Species: H. major

Binomial name
- Himacerus major Costa, 1842

= Himacerus major =

Species of true bug

Himacerus major is a species damsel bug in the family Nabidae. It is found in the Holarctic. The range is from South Scandinavia and the South of the British Isles over West Europe including the Western Mediterranean, Central Europe and Eastern Europe and in the Caucasus. It is also found in North America. Himacerus major occurs in many different habitats with grass, regardless of the level of humidity. The species occurs on very dry dune habitats, and nutrient-poor grasslands, as well as wet shores of waters without woody vegetation and salt places inland. The species occurs in very large numbers near the coast of the Northern Baltic Sea. It is absent from woodland.

The young nymphs of Himacerus major live predominantly on the ground. Older nymphs, and the adults may be encountered at night in higher parts of the vegetation such as, for example, shrubs. During the day they hide in ground litter or in grass or similar. If the species has a specific range of prey, is unknown. They have been observed in the sucking on Auchenorrhyncha. Overwintering occurs as the egg. The nymphs occur from May and can be observed in the Autumn. The adult bugs occur from July, rarely even from end of June and are active mainly in August and September. The females insert their eggs in grass.
