= Johan Christian Drewsen =

Danish paper manufacturer, agronomist and politician

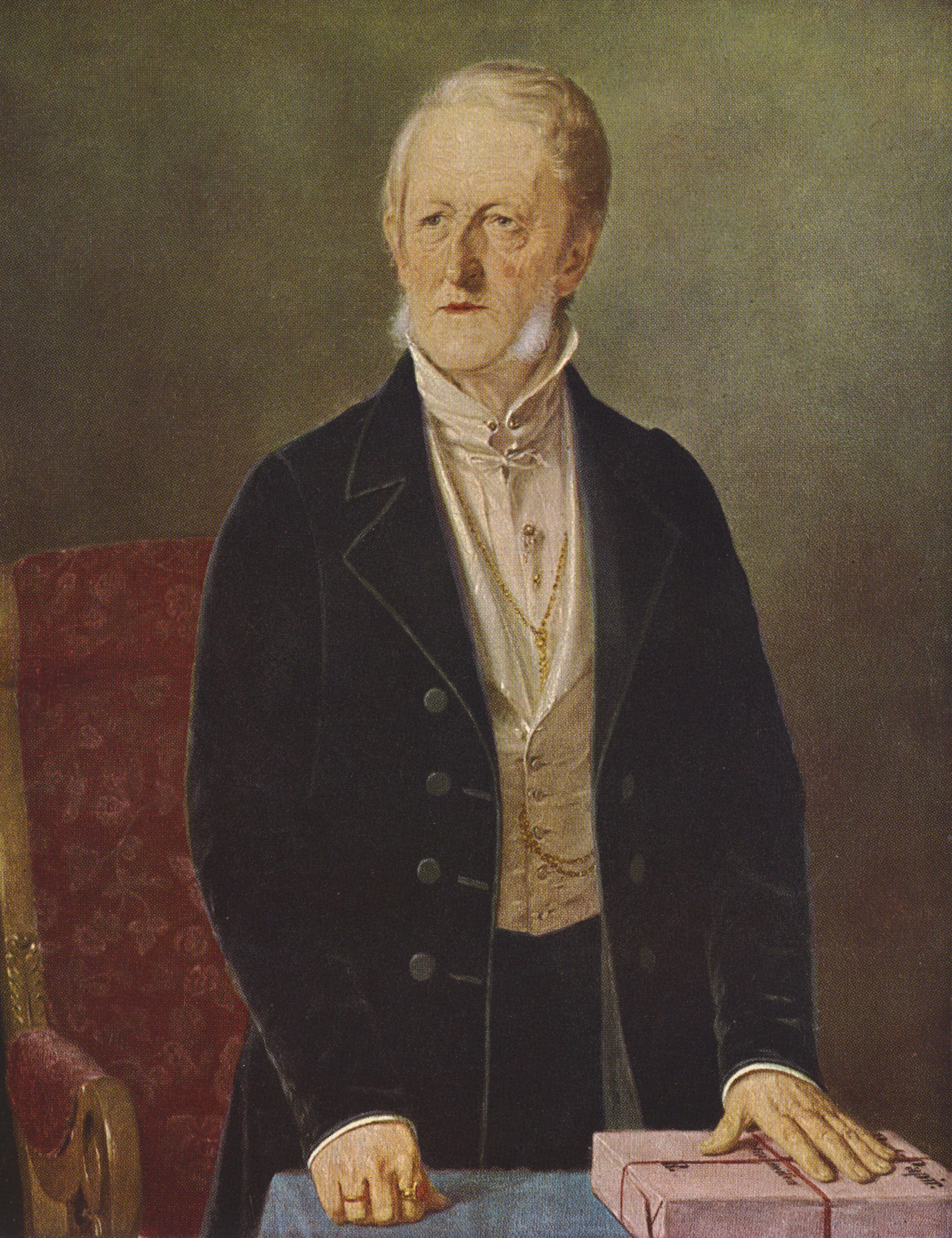
- J. C. Drewsen painted by Jørgen Roed in 1843
- Born: 23 December 1777; Copenhagen, Denmark
- Died: 25 August 1853 (aged 75); Copenhagen, Denmark
- Occupation: Industrialist

Johan Christian Drewsen (23 December 1777 – 25 August 1851) was a Danish paper manufacturer, agronomist and politician. He owned Strandmøllen north of Copenhagen.

== Early life and education ==
Drewsen was born at Strandmøllen, the son of paper manufacturer Christian Drewsen (1745–1810). His paternal family had come to Denmark from Hanover where they had been involved in manufacturing paper since 1692. Prominent cultural figures such as Knud Lyne Rahbek and Adam Oehlenschläger were frequent visitors to the home. The writer and translator Hans Guldberg Sveistrup was a house tutor. His friend, Conrad Malte-Brun, sought refuge at Strandmøllen when he had to flee the country in 1793. Drewsen was apprenticed to his father but was struck by the new ideas of the time and the revolution and planned to become an army officer and go into French military service. He did, however, change his mind after falling in love with Johanne Ophelia Rosing, a daughter of the actor Michael Rosing.

== Farmer and agronomist ==
When Drewsen was married in 1898, his father gave him the agricultural estate Smidstrup some ten kilometres north of Strandmøllen. By studying German literature on farming, and consulting the most successful farmers in the area, the pastors in Gentofte and Kongens Lyngby, and the brothers Jean and Frédéric de Coninck at Frederikslund, he acquired a great knowledge about farming. He introduced new technology (such as the Scottish plough) as well as new practices (such as crop rotation) and crops (large-scale cultivation of potatoes).

He became a member of the Royal Danish Agricultural Society ('Det Kongelige Danske Landhusholdningsselskab') in 1812 where he became the editor and writer of several publications on farming. He received the society's silver medal for a work on crop rotation in 1813 and its gold medal for a work on cultivation of clover. He also published a nine-volume translation of Albrecht Thaer's works on agronomy (Grundsætninger for Landøkonomien I-IV, 1816–19). From 1819 to 1930, he served as one of the society's three presidents.

Together with Jonas Collin, he was the founder of the Agricultural Society for Copenhagen County ('Agerdyrkningsselskabet for Københavns Amt') in 1818 (closed 1824). In 1819, he went on a study trip to Germany. Together with Frédéric de Coninck and pastor Rønne, he was the publisher of the journal Landøkonomiske Tidender (I–VII, 1815–1817), which he later continued alone (VIII–IX, 1818–1819; Nye landøkonomiske Tidender I-IV, 1819–1825). His most important work on agronomy, Betragtninger, was published in 1834 (second edition 1842). In 1841 and 1842 he published some minor works on the breeding of silk worms and cultivation of mulberry trees. He was involved in a controversy with professor Oluf Christian Olufsen.

== The paper mill ==
Drewsen inherited Strandmøllen in 1810. It developed into the largest paper mill in the country after he modernized it with the introduction of steam engines and a hydraulic press. A major expansion took place in 1830. Drewsen had a monopoly on delivery of paper to the state as well as to the National Bank and completely dominated the market for paper used for printing. In 1844, the company was ceded to his sons Christian and Michael Drewsen.

== Politics ==
In 1834, he became a member of Roskilde Stænderforsamling and soon became a leading figure in the fight for better conditions for peasants. In the 1840s, he supported the liberal movement as well as the Danish movement in Sønderjylland. In 1846 he was one of the founders of Bondevennernes Selskab and became a member of its board but broke with it in 1848 when it left the liberal movement. In 1835, he was a co-founder of the Society for the Proper Use of the Freedom of the Press ('Selskabet for Trykkefrihedens rette Brug'). He was a member of Folketinget in 1849–1850.

== Personal life ==
Drewsen shared his time between Strandmøllen and an apartment in Copenhagen. From 1799 to 1804, it was located at Vestergade 32 (demolished). From 1807 to 1811, it was located at Knabrostræde 12. In 1844, it was located at Ny Kongensgade 8. From 1845 to 1849, it was located at Kronprinsensgade 8. From 1850 to 1851, it was located at Store Kongensgade 62. His son Christian Drewsen who took over the paper mill along with another son Michael was an amateur entomologist.

== Written works ==
- Drewsen, J. C.: Nogle erfaringer angaaende vexeldrift forenet med brakfrugtavl og Sommerstaldfodring (1814)

== See also ==
- Christian Hasselbalch
