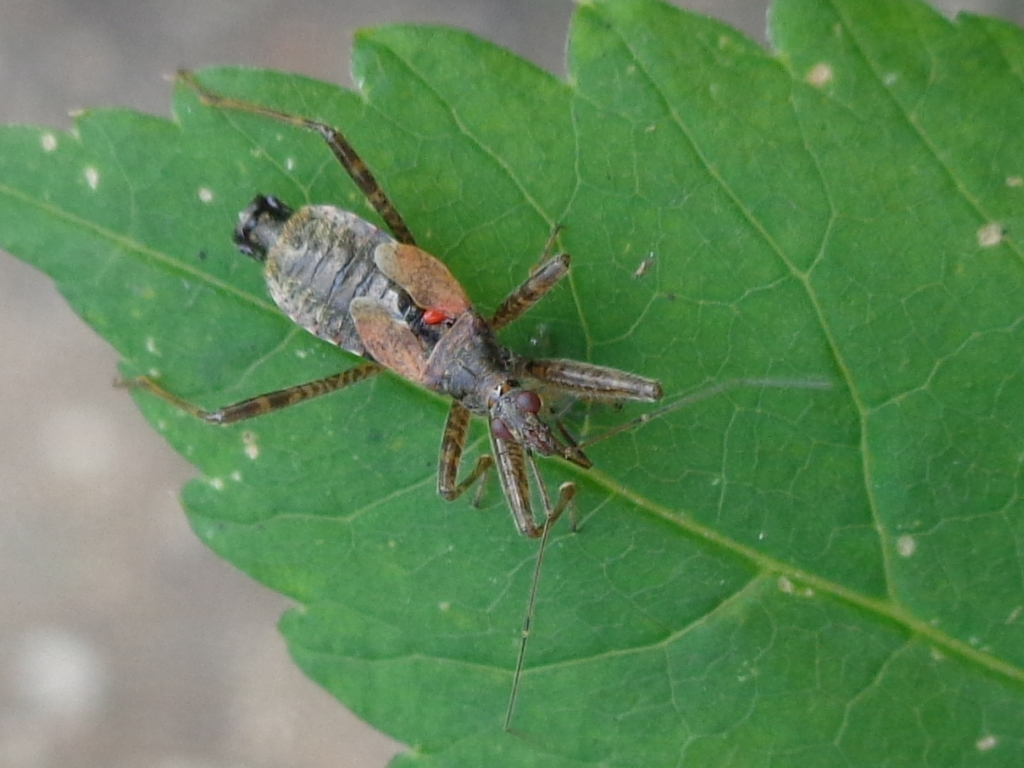
- Himacerus apterus

Scientific classification
- Kingdom: Animalia
- Phylum: Arthropoda
- Class: Insecta
- Order: Hemiptera
- Suborder: Heteroptera
- Family: Nabidae
- Genus: Himacerus
- Species: H. apterus

Binomial name
- Himacerus apterus (Fabricius, 1798)

= Himacerus apterus =

Tree damsel bug

Species of true bug

View history

Himacerus apterus in copula

Himacerus apterus, known as the tree damsel bug, is a species of damsel bug belonging to the family Nabidae, subfamily Nabinae.

== Description ==
The species is 8–10.5 millimetres (0.31–0.41 in) long for males and 9–11.5 millimetres (0.35–0.45 in) for females. It has black connexivum and orange-red spots with reddish-brown wings. It wingspan is 8–10 millimetres (0.31–0.39 in)

== Distribution ==
It is found in most of Europe and southern and central Asia. Between 1943 and 1989 the species was found in eastern Nova Scotia.

== Diet ==
The species feeds on mites, aphids and other small insects.

== Ecology ==
Adults lay eggs in late summer on plant stems which hatch in spring. Larvae are found from May to August.
