= Strandmøllen, Rudersdal Municipality =

Former papermill, north of Copenhagen

Coordinates: 55.8069°N 12.5806°E

Strandmøllen (literally "The Beach Mill") is a former paper mill located at the mouth of the Mølleåen river in the Øresund coast north of Copenhagen, Denmark.

== History ==
=== Origins ===
The first watermill at the site was built as a paper mill in the 16th century and was later used as a fulling mill.

=== Drewsen family ===
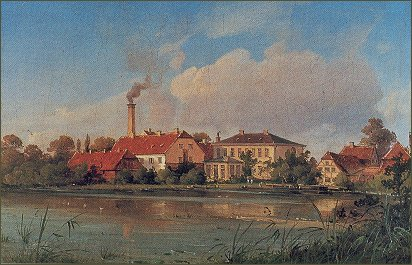
Strandmøllen painted by Vilhelm Petersen in 1855

In 1718, Strandmøllen was acquired by Christian Drewsen. He used it as a paper mill. Strandmøllen was after his death continued by his son, Johan Christian Drewsen, under whose management it became the leading Danish paper manufacturer of its day. The company was later continued by his sons Christian Drewsen and Michael Drewsen. The latter founded a paper mill at Silkeborg.

Niels Sigfred Nebelong designed a residence for the Drewsen family which was completed in 1850. The house was frequented by many leading Danish literary figures of the day.

=== De Forenede Papirfabrikker ===
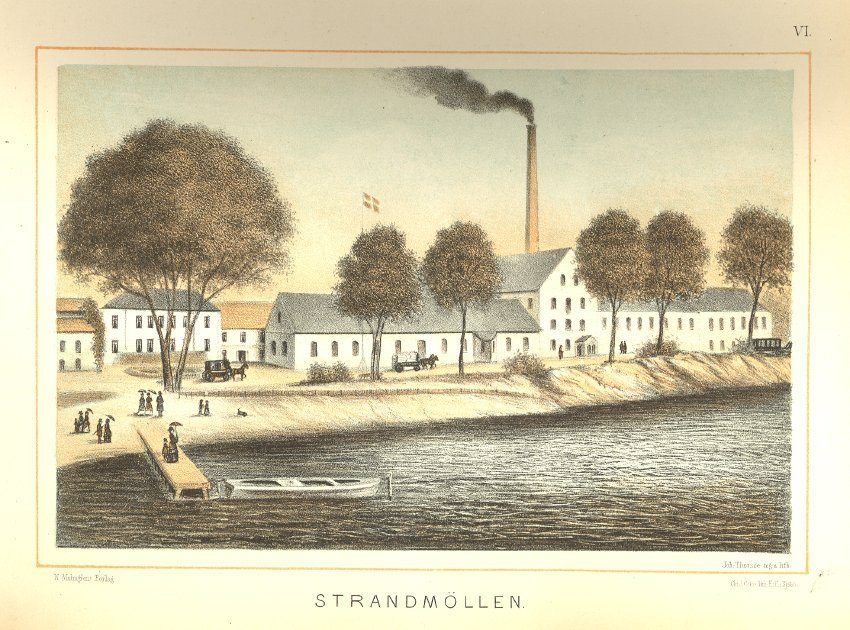
Strandmøllen on an illustration from Danmarks industrielle Etablissementer

In 1889, Strandmøllen merged with several other paper mills under the name De Forenede Paperfabrikker ("United Paper Mills"). The company decommissioned the Strandmøllen complex in 1898.

=== Later history ===
Most of the industrial complex was demolished in 1918 but immediately thereafter restored by the architect Carl Brummer. In 1920–21, Christian Nielsen established a production of hydrogen and oxygen at Strandmøllen. The company, A/S Strandmøllen, has been owned by a foundation since 1967 and is still based at the site.

== In popular culture ==
- Hans Christian Andersen's 1949 fairytale The Shirt-Collar was inspired by Strandmøllen.
