= Jørgen Matthias Christian Schiødte =

Danish entomologist (1815–1884)

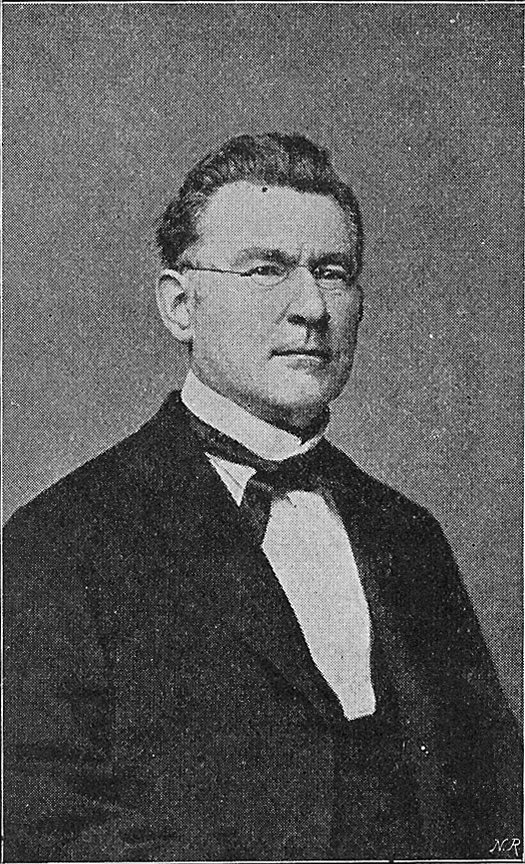
Jørgen Matthias Christian Schiødte

Jørgen Matthias Christian Schiødte or Jørgen Christian Matthias Schiødte (20 April 1815 – 22 April 1884) was a Danish entomologist, professor and museum curator. His special interest was in the beetles but he also worked on other arthropods. He was also a trained illustrator and copperplate engraver.

== Life and work ==
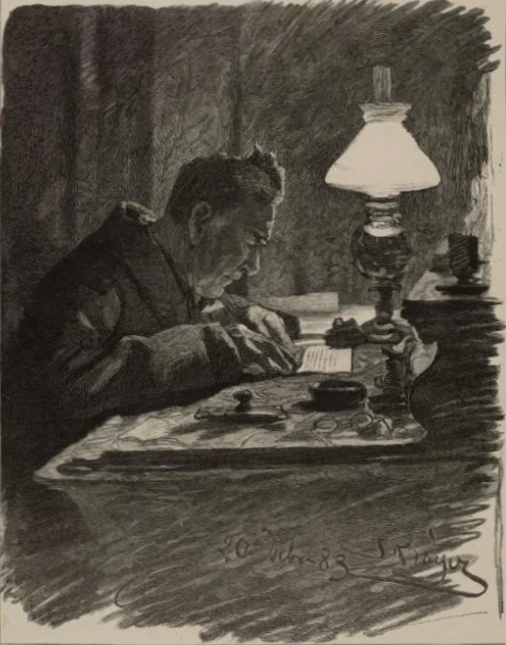
Schiødte sketched by Peder Severin Krøyer, 1883

Schiødte was born in Copenhagen to Mons (Magnus) Laurids S. (1775–1840) and Helene Maria Beck (1782–1833). He became interested in entomology as a schoolboy and was influenced as a teenager by Christian Drewsen. Drewsen introduced him to other entomologists including B. W. Westermann and Henrik Krøyer. He also became a member of the natural history association. The interest in entomology came in the way of his schooling and he finished school at the Borgerdyd School at Christianshavn only in 1832 and then went to study medicine. In 1837 he applied for funds to make collections of Danish insects. Using the funding he travelled and collected numerous Danish carabids and water beetles and in 1841 he published a catalog of the Danish beetles. He trained from copperplate engravers and made 24 plates to illustrate the work. He dedicated it to Krøyer. From 1842, he was employed as curator under J. H. Reinhardt of the Natural History Museum of Denmark and was a titled professor at the University of Copenhagen from 1854. He collected 70000 specimens for the museum. One of his interests was in the cave fauna and collected in the Adelsberg cave. In 1848 Reinhardt was replaced by Japetus Steenstrup with whom Schiødte clashed frequently. In 1859 he wrote on biological pest control.

Darwin had read Schiødte's work on cave faunas and quoted it noting that cave faunas showed affinity to nearby non-cave species rather than cave fauna from afar. He quoted Schiodte noting that : 'We accordingly look upon the subterranean faunas as small ramifications which have penetrated into the earth from the geographically limited faunas of the adjacent tracts, and which, as they extended themselves into darkness, have been accommodated to surrounding circumstances. Animals not far remote from ordinary forms, prepare the transition from light to darkness. Next follow those that are constructed for twilight; and, last of all, those destined for total darkness, and whose formation is quite peculiar.

Schiødte is also known for documenting, for the first time in 1853, insects living in obligatory association with termites—a complex phenomenon now known as termitophily. These insects were unlike anything he had previously encountered in his studies of beetles, which focused mainly on the Danish fauna. They exhibited an extraordinary morphology, as Schiødte noted: "The abdomen is constructed in a most extraordinary manner, being membranaceous, of an enormous size, bent upwards so as to cover the thorax, and fixed in this position by the dorsal faces of the second and third segments having grown together." These particular specimens were collected in Brazil in 1852, where his colleague Johannes Theodor Reinhardt had been assisting with the paleontological work of Peter Wilhelm Lund.

His best known publications were

- Genera og species of Danmarks Eleutherata at tjene som fauna for denne orden og som indledning til dens anatomie og historie (1841)
- Naturhistoriske bidrag til en beskrivelse of Grønland / af J. Reinhardt, J.C. Schiødte, O.A.L. Mørch, C.F. Lütken, J. Lange, H. Rink. Særskilt aftryk af tillæggene til "Grønland, geographisk og statistisk beskrevet," af H. Rink. 1857
- De metamorphosi eleutheratorum observationes : bidrag til insekternes udviklingshistorie / ved J. C. Schiødte.Kjøbenhavn Thieles Bogtrykkeri, 1861–72. online

In addition, he described numerous species of insects as well as the spider genus Liphistius.

He married Fylla Hellmann in 1848 and they had a son Erik (1849-1909) who studied architecture.

== Other sources ==
- Wolff, Torben (1993). "More than 200 years of crustacean research in Denmark". In Truesdale, Frank (ed.). History of Carcinology. CRC Press. pp. 211–212. ISBN 978-90-5410-137-6.
- Groll, E. K. (Hrsg.): Biografien der Entomologen der Welt : Datenbank. Version 4.15 : Senckenberg Deutsches Entomologisches Institut, 2010
